= Operation Pokpung =

Korean War offensive

Operation Pokpung 폭풍 작전 (暴風作戰)
- Part of the Korean War
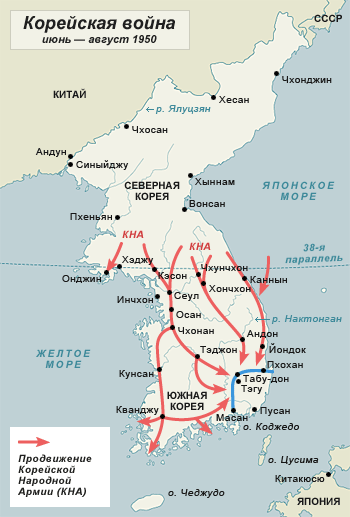
- Soviet summary of the military operation plan
Date	25–30 June 1950
Location	38th parallel north (erstwhile Korean border)
Result	DPRK tactical victory: Occupation of Seoul; Seizure of most of the Korean Peninsula; Dissolution of most of the ROK military; ROK strategic success: Devastation of the DPRK's II Corps by the ROK's 6th Infantry Division; Delaying tactics stall the DPRK's invasion; ROK's defense bolstered by American military response on 27 June

Belligerents
North Korea (DPRK); Supported by: Soviet Union	South Korea (ROK); United States

Commanders and leaders
Kim Il Sung; Choe Yong-gon; Kang Kon	Syngman Rhee; Shin Song-mo; Chae Byong-duk; Chung Il-kwon; Sohn Won-yil

Strength
198,380	105,752

Operation Pokpung (Korean: 폭풍 작전, lit. ''Operation Storm'') was the invasion of South Korea (Republic of Korea, ROK) by North Korea (Democratic People's Republic of Korea, DPRK) that triggered the Korean War. On Sunday, 25 June 1950, North Korean forces launched the blitzkrieg by crossing the 38th parallel north and swarming South Korea at 04:00 PYT/KST. The DPRK did not declare war before the invasion and rushed to encircle and eventually capture Seoul, the capital of South Korea, from the ROK within a week.

North Korea had mobilized for an invasion of South Korea for over a year prior with clandestine support from the Soviet Union, which trained and supplied the DPRK's Korean People's Army (KPA) with weapons, munitions, armored fighting vehicles, tanks, and aircraft. The vastly superiorly armed and trained KPA overwhelmed and overran the ill-prepared and underarmed Republic of Korea Army (ROKA); thus the DPRK captured Seoul within three days on 28 June.

The goal of Operation Pokpung was to take control of the entire Korean Peninsula by 15 August 1950—50 days, with an average advance of 10 kilometres (6.2 miles) each day—in commemoration of the fifth anniversary of Gwangbokjeol. However, heavy losses were inflicted on the DPRK's II Corps by the ROK's 6th Infantry Division, stalling the DPRK's advance in the east, ceasing the blitzkrieg at the Pusan Perimeter. This delay allowed sufficient time for the United States to deploy from Japan to South Korea on 27 June to prevent the impending capitulation of the ROK.

The United Nations immediately reprimanded North Korea for the invasion as a solution to the Korean conflict. As a response, on 7 July, the United Nations Command (UNC) was established to direct a multinational military response against the DPRK's invasion of South Korea.

== Background ==
Soviet leader Joseph Stalin's influence over DPRK leader Kim Il Sung dictated the timing of the invasion. Kim Il Sung and ROK leader Syngman Rhee both wanted to reunify Korea. Kim's objective was to achieve reunification through force. Kim was not able to achieve his goal without Stalin's assistance. On 30 January 1950, Stalin contacted ambassador Terenty Shtykov and explained he was ready to help organize an invasion plan. Stalin noted that in order to capture South Korea, Kim would need to be prepared to minimise the risk of a lengthy battle. In the lead up to April 1950, Kim requested to launch an invasion on repeated occasions, but Stalin did not allow Kim to launch the invasion until favorable tactical conditions in the Far East emerged.

Since March 1950, the Korean People's Army (KPA) started to build up its armament and redeployed its troops to get ready to attack South Korea. On 16 May officers of the DPRK and Soviet Union began final inspections for the war.

Kim met Stalin in Moscow in April 1950 to formulate the invasion plan. Stalin permitted the plan on the condition that the Chinese allies were also in agreement. On 13 May Kim went to Beijing to meet Mao Zedong. On 14 May Mao reviewed Stalin's telegram and approved the North Korean invasion. Stalin had dispatched Lieutenant General Vasiliev, to prepare the invasion plan before the Stalin-Kim meeting was held in Moscow in April. On 29 May Vasiliev and General Kang Kon, the Chief of the General Staff of the KPA, finalised the invasion plan.

On 10 June the DPRK Ministry of People's Defense secretly summoned all division and brigade commanders to Pyongyang for a meeting. Kang Kon ordered troops to be fully ready for an offensive operation in disguise of defensive operation by 23 June. On 11 June the KPA was reorganized into two corps, and the divisions that were placed at the rear started to move as close as 10 to 15 km of north to the 38th parallel. Advanced forces from the KPA 2nd Division moved to Kumhwa on the same day. The entire division was placed in Kumhwa by 14 June. By 23 June all KPA forces involved in the invasion were positioned around the 38th parallel.

On 18 June the Ministry of People's Defense sent Reconnaissance Order Number 1 (정찰명령 제1호) to division commanders to gather information about locations of the ROKA forces and terrain. On 22 June after completion of reconnaissance and reorganization and approval from Stalin, Soviet military advisors ordered the Ministry of People's Defense to send Engagement Order Number 1 (전투명령 제1호) to its divisions.

In the meantime, Kim informed Stalin that the war would be started on 25 June, and Stalin consented to the plan. As scheduled, the KPA began the operation and crossed the 38th parallel at 04:00 KST on 25 June 1950.

== Conflicting accounts of instigation ==
There have been conflicting accounts regarding the opening phases of the battle from sources on both sides. This resulted in discrepancies about which army initiated military action on 25 June 1950. When the war began, Kim held a governmental emergency meeting and stated the following to the members of the Workers' Party of Korea who did not realize the situation:

Comrades, the forces of traitor Rhee Syngman have crossed the 38th parallel and started a full-scale invasion to challenge our northern republic.

A report on behalf of the United Nations Commission on Korea (UNCOK) was submitted on 24 June by two Australian military observers, Major F. S. B. Peach and Squadron Leader R. J. Rankin. The report made claim that ROK forces were organised entirely for defence and were in no condition to carry out an attack on a large scale against the forces of the North. The inadequate resources of the ROKA, in particular the absence of armor, air support and heavy artillery, rendered a South Korean invasion of the North militarily impossible. At 17:00 on 25 June the field observers had reported that North Korean forces had that morning mounted a surprise attack all along the 38th parallel. However, Kim had claimed in a broadcast made on 26 June at 09:20 that South Korea had attacked the North in the section of Haeju, provoking counterattacks. In the light of the report by Peach and Rankin, UNCOK unanimously rejected the North Korean contention. There remains undisclosed information from the Soviet and North Korean side.

== Order of battle ==
Almost the entire forces from both sides were involved in the operation either directly or indirectly. The order is at the beginning stage of the operation, and only the major combatants are listed below.

=== North Korea (DPRK) ===
==== Army ====
- I Corps
  - 1st Infantry Division
    - 1st Infantry Regiment
    - 2nd Infantry Regiment
    - 3rd Infantry Regiment
  - 3rd Infantry Division
    - 7th Infantry Regiment
    - 8th Infantry Regiment
    - 9th Infantry Regiment
  - 4th Infantry Division
    - 5th Infantry Regiment
    - 16th Infantry Regiment
    - 18th Infantry Regiment
  - 6th Infantry Division
    - 13th Infantry Regiment
    - 14th Infantry Regiment
    - 15th Infantry Regiment
- II Corps
  - 2nd Infantry Division
  - 5th Infantry Division
    - 10th Infantry Regiment
    - 11th Infantry Regiment
    - 12th Infantry Regiment
  - 7th Infantry Division
  - 8th Infantry Division
    - 81st Infantry Regiment
    - 82nd Infantry Regiment
    - 83rd Infantry Regiment
  - 15th Infantry Division
    - 48th Infantry Regiment
    - 49th Infantry Regiment
    - 50th Infantry Regiment
- 9th Infantry Division
- 10th Infantry Division
- 13th Infantry Division
- 105th Armored Brigade
  - 107th Armored Regiment
  - 109th Armored Regiment
  - 203rd Armored Regiment
  - 206th Mechanized Regiment
- 549th Infantry Regiment
- 766th Infantry Regiment

==== 38th Parallel Guard ====
- 1st Guard Brigade
- 3rd Guard Brigade

=== South Korea (ROK) ===
==== Army ====
- Capital Division
  - 3rd Infantry Regiment
  - 18th Infantry Regiment
- 1st Infantry Division
  - 11th Infantry Regiment
  - 12th Infantry Regiment
  - 13th Infantry Regiment
- 2nd Infantry Division
  - 5th Infantry Regiment
  - 16th Infantry Regiment
  - 25th Infantry Regiment
- 3rd Infantry Division
  - 18th Infantry Regiment
  - 22nd Infantry Regiment
  - 23rd Infantry Regiment
- 5th Infantry Division
  - 15th Infantry Regiment
  - 20th Infantry Regiment
- 6th Infantry Division
  - 2nd Infantry Regiment
  - 7th Infantry Regiment
  - 19th Infantry Regiment
- 7th Infantry Division
  - 1st Infantry Regiment
  - 9th Infantry Regiment
- 8th Infantry Division
  - 10th Infantry Regiment
  - 21st Infantry Regiment
- 17th Infantry Regiment

== Invasion ==
On 24 June 1950, North Korean forces were ordered to their starting positions by 24:00. At 10:00 on 25 June The Pentagon received a report detailing that North Korean forces had invaded the South at several locations. The report claimed combat was initiated at 04:40 when Ongjin was hit by North Korean artillery fire. Individual KPA units advanced 3 to 5 kilometres into South Korean territory within the first three hours. The ROKA put up strong resistance in the direction of Ongjin, Kaesong and Seoul. Ongjin, Kaesong and Sinyuri were captured on the first day. KPA forces advanced 12 kilometres in the Chunchon (Sunsen) direction and 8 kilometres along the eastern coast.

Two amphibious landings occurred on the coast south of Kangnung at 05:25. One landing occurred in the Kangnung (Korio) region and consisted of two battalions of naval infantry and 1,000 partisans. The other landing occurred in the Uljin (Urutsyn) area and consisted of 600 partisans. The city of Uljin (Urutsyn) was captured. The South Korean military engaged North Korean warships, but the landings were successful.

The KPA invasion was spearheaded by Soviet manufactured T-34 medium tanks, equipped with high-velocity 85 mm guns. The armor proved nearly impregnable to the ill-equipped ROKA, which lacked tanks and antitank guns capable of penetrating the T-34's armor. The T-34 weighed 29 tons, making it light enough to withstand limits on Korean railroad bridges. Air support was provided by 150 Soviet manufactured Yakovlev Yak-9 fighters, Ilyushin Il-10 attack bombers and Yakovlev Yak-11 trainer aircraft. The aircraft provided close air support and also bombed Seoul and strategic locations.

The battle continued on 26 June with further advances by KPA forces into South Korea. The Kaesong and Ongjin peninsula were cleared. The 1st and 4th Divisions captured Tongduchon (Tongducheb) and Munsan (Bunsan). The 2nd Division took Chunchon (Siunseen). The 6th Division crossed the bay and captured the point in the direction of Kimpo Airfield. The forces from the amphibious landings advanced and had taken the port of Tubuiri. The main force advanced through the Uijongbu corridor towards Seoul.

The South Korean forces did not have enough aircraft or tanks to counter the invasion. A significant portion of the South Korean forces, numbering 65,000 combat troops and 33,000 support troops, began deserting. On 28 June ROK forces demolished the Hangang Bridge in an attempt to slow the KPA invasion. The demolition resulted in South Korean refugee casualties and stranded the ROKA 5th Division. KPA forces were able to cross the river later that day and occupy Seoul. A Soviet report regarding the invasion highlighted inadequacies in KPA operations. Communication within the KPA was inefficient. The general staff did not direct battle, since from the beginning of the forward advance, staff communication was weak. The unit commanders did not receive commands from senior staff. The report stated that the KPA command did not have battle experience. Once Soviet military advisers withdrew, the battle was poorly commanded. The directed use of tanks and artillery in battle was tactically unsound. However, the KPA soldiers were enthusiastic and dedicated to completing their role.

The people of North Korea responded positively to the news of the invasion. They had a strong belief in the North Korean government and the KPA.

== Cold War propaganda ==
In the United States, the invasion was reported in mainstream media as an act of aggression by North Korea. The event also became an additional source of political division during the Cold War period. A 27 June 1950 New York Times article headlined "U.S. Blames Russia" describes the event as an "act of aggression", "lawless" and "an invasion of the American-sponsored republic as another threat by Russia into a soft spot of the free countries." It also claims "the [US] Administration held Soviet Union responsible as the motivating power behind the North Korean government."

The official North Korean account of the Korean War describes the battle under the title "Outstanding and Brilliant Victory," and claims that the battle was an anti-imperialist defence measure against the "enemies of the people". Further North Korean accounts claim that the United States' imperialists had prompted South Korean forces to launch a surprise armed invasion of the DPRK at dawn on 25 June, with over 100,000 South Korean soldiers penetrating two kilometres into North Korean territory, aiming to conquer the [North] Korean people. The report refers to the South Korean troops as "puppets" of the "aggressive, imperialist" United States and that the "country and people were faced with a grave danger."

== Aftermath ==
On 30 June 1950 President of the United States Harry S. Truman released a statement highlighting that the invasion of South Korea had grown the threat of communism to the Pacific area and the United States. In response to the invasion, Truman ordered the United States military to provide assistance to air and land forces in Korea. Moreover, Truman ordered the United States Seventh Fleet to prevent a Chinese military attack on Taiwan and strengthened the United States forces in the Philippines.

As a result of North Korea's invasion, the United Nations Security Council (UNSC) passed UNSC Resolution 84. The resolution authorised the use of the UN flag in operations against North Korean forces and those nations partaking. The UNSC provided a recommendation to members to provide assistance to the Republic of Korea in repelling the North Korean attack and restoring worldwide peace and security.
