= Battle of the Pusan Perimeter order of battle =

This is the order of battle for United Nations and North Korean forces during the Battle of Pusan Perimeter in August and September 1950 during the Korean War. The engagement brought each side to muster substantial ground, air and sea resources to fight across southeastern Korea.

The UN brought to bear hundreds of units from member countries South Korea, the United States, and the United Kingdom. Several other nations augmented the large naval task forces with ships of their own, including Australia, New Zealand, Canada, and The Netherlands. Opposing the UN force was the entirety of the North Korean military.

UN forces proved superior to the North Koreans in organization and numbers, but UN forces also suffered from a lack of equipment and training, particularly in their ground forces. As the battles around Pusan Perimeter continued, UN forces and equipment continued to flood into Korea, giving them overwhelming advantages in their land, air, and sea components. Though many nations would eventually contribute forces to the Korean War, the majority of troops at the battle were American and South Korean only.

North Korean forces were inferior to the UN forces in number, but in several cases they were able to make up for this in superior training. North Korean air and naval forces were small and poorly trained and equipped, thus playing a negligible role in the battle. However North Korean ground troops were often well trained and well equipped with modern weapons. The protracted battle around the perimeter severely depleted these troops forcing the North Koreans to rely increasingly on conscripts and replacements, diminishing their advantage in the battle and leading them to an eventual defeat.

== UN Forces ==
=== Ground ===
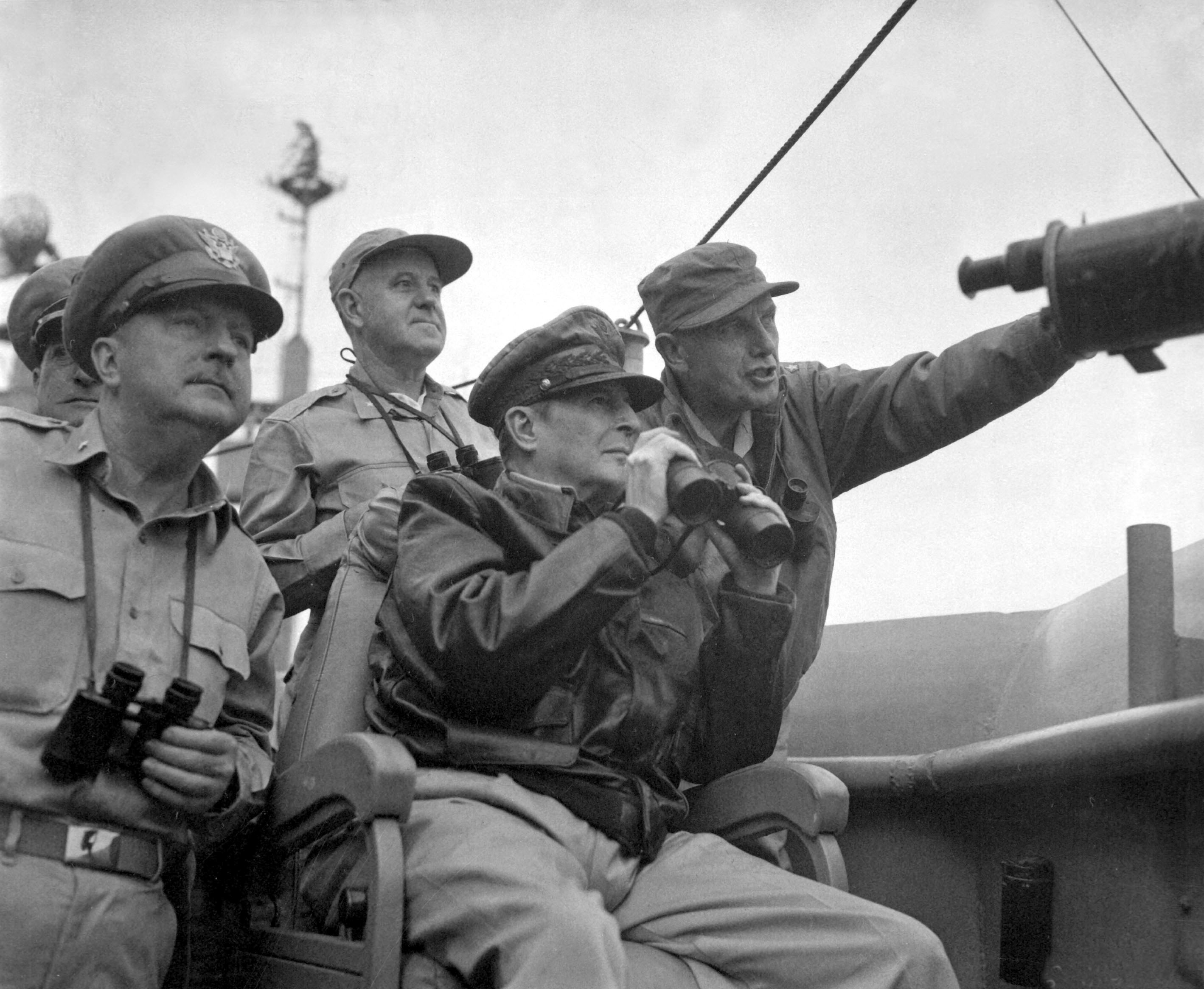
General of the Army Douglas MacArthur (center) retained overall command of the UN forces during the fight at Pusan

The United Nations forces were organized under the command of the United States Army. The Eighth United States Army served as the headquarters component for the UN forces, and was headquartered at Taegu. Under it were three weak US Divisions; the 24th Infantry Division was brought to the country early in July, while the 1st Cavalry Division and 25th Infantry Division arrived between July 14 and July 18. These forces occupied the western segment of the perimeter, along the Naktong river.

The Republic of Korea Army, a force of 58,000, was organized into two corps and five divisions; from east to west, ROK I Corps controlled the 8th Infantry Division and Capital Divisions, while the ROK II Corps controlled the 1st Division and 6th Infantry Division. A reconstituted ROK 3rd Division was placed under direct ROK Army control. Morale among the UN units was low due to the large number of defeats at that point in the war. US Forces had suffered over 6,000 casualties over the past month while the South Korean Army had lost an estimated 70,000.

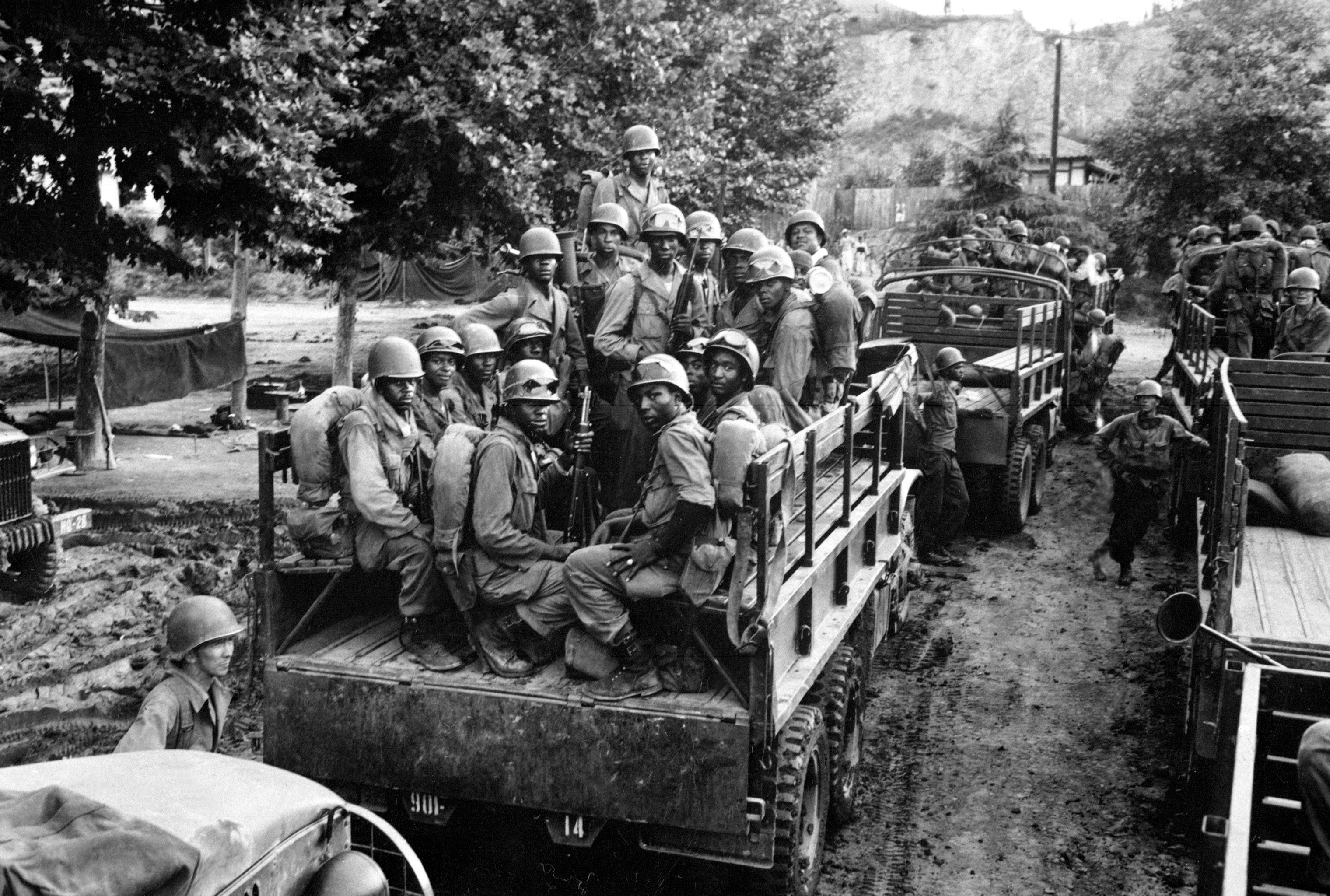
Troops of the 24th Infantry Division move to Pusan Perimeter

Troop numbers at the beginning of the battle were initially difficult to estimate for US and North Korean forces. Subsequent research indicates that the North Korean army had around 70,000 combat troops committed to the Pusan Perimeter on August 5, with most of its divisions far understrength. It likely had less than 3,000 personnel in mechanized units, and around 40 T-34 tanks at the front due to extensive losses so far in the war. MacArthur reported 141,808 UN troops in Korea on August 4, of which 47,000 were in US ground combat units and 45,000 were in South Korean combat units. Thus the UN ground force outnumbered the North Koreans 92,000 to 70,000.

Throughout September 1950 as the battle raged, more UN forces arrived from the US and other locations. The 2nd Infantry Division, 5th Regimental Combat Team, and 1st Provisional Marine Brigade and a British Army brigade arrived in Pusan later in the fighting, along with large numbers of fresh troops and equipment, including over 500 tanks. By the end of the battle, Eighth Army's force had gone from three under-strength divisions to four fully manned formations which were well equipped and well prepared for war. By the end of the battle, the 27th British Commonwealth Brigade had arrived to assist the American and South Korean units.

==== US 8th Army ====
Eighth United States Army
Commander: Lieutenant General Walton H. Walker

- I Corp operational 12 September 1950.
- IX Corp operational 23 September 1950.

Unit	Sub-units	Notes
1st Cavalry Division; Major General Hobart R. Gay	5th Cavalry Regiment; 7th Cavalry Regiment; 8th Cavalry Regiment; 61st Field Artillery Battalion; 77th Field Artillery Battalion; 82nd Field Artillery Battalion; 99th Field Artillery Battalion; 29th Antiaircraft Artillery Battalion; 70th Medium Tank Battalion; 8th Combat Engineer Battalion; 16th Reconnaissance Company; 15th Medical Battalion; 13th Signal Company; 27th Ordnance Maintenance Battalion; 15th Quartermaster Company; 15th Military Police Company; 15th Replacement Company	Reported a strength of 10,276 on August 4 Stood at 14,703 by September 1.
2nd Infantry Division; Major General Laurence B. Keiser	9th Infantry Regiment; 23rd Infantry Regiment; 38th Infantry Regiment; 15th Field Artillery Battalion; 37th Field Artillery Battalion; 38th Field Artillery Battalion; 503rd Field Artillery Battalion; 82nd Antiaircraft Artillery Battalion; 72nd Medium Tank Battalion; 2nd Combat Engineer Battalion; 2nd Reconnaissance Company; 2nd Medical Company; 2nd Signal Company; 702nd Ordnance Maintenance Battalion; 2nd Quartermaster Company; 2nd Military Police Company; 2nd Replacement Company	Reported a strength of 4,922 in Korea on August 4 Stood at 17,498 by September 1.
24th Infantry Division; Major General John H. Church	19th Infantry Regiment; 21st Infantry Regiment; 34th Infantry Regiment; 5th Regimental Combat Team; 11th Field Artillery Battalion; 13th Field Artillery Battalion; 52nd Field Artillery Battalion; 63rd Field Artillery Battalion; 26th Antiaircraft Artillery Battalion; 6th Medium Tank Battalion; 3rd Combat Engineer Battalion; 24th Reconnaissance Company; 24th Medical Battalion; 24th Signal Company; 724th Ordnance Maintenance Battalion; 24th Quartermaster Company; 24th Military Police Company; 24th Replacement Company	Reported a strength of 14,540 on August 4 Stood at 14,739 by September 1.
25th Infantry Division; Major General William B. Kean	24th Infantry Regiment; 27th Infantry Regiment; 35th Infantry Regiment; 29th Regimental Combat Team; 8th Field Artillery Battalion; 64th Field Artillery Battalion; 69th Field Artillery Battalion; 90th Field Artillery Battalion; 89th Medium Tank Battalion; 65th Combat Engineer Battalion; 25th Reconnaissance Company; 25th Medical Battalion; 25th Signal Company; 725th Ordnance Maintenance Battalion; 25th Quartermaster Company; 25th Military Police Company; 25th Replacement Company	Reported a strength of 12,073 on August 4 Stood at 15,007 by September 1.
1st Provisional Marine Brigade; Brigadier General Edward A. Craig	5th Marine Regiment; Detachment, 1st Marine Division Military Police Company; Detachment, 1st Reconnaissance Battalion; Counterintelligence Corps and Military Intelligence Special Detachment (US Army); A Company, 1st Combat Engineer Battalion; C Company, 1st Medical Battalion; A Company, 1st Motor Transport Battalion; Detachment, 1st Ordnance Battalion; Detachment, 1st Service Battalion; A Company, 1st Shore Party Battalion; Detachment, 1st Signal Battalion; A Company, 1st Tank Battalion; 1st Amphibian Tractor Company; Detachment, 1st Combat Service Group; 1st Platoon, 1st Amphibian Truck Company	Reported a strength of 4,725 on August 5. Stood at 4,290 by September 1.
(United Kingdom) 27th Commonwealth Brigade; Brigadier Basil Coad	1st Battalion, Middlesex Regiment; 1st Battalion, Argyll and Sutherland Highlanders	Arrived 26 August, having left one battalion in Hong Kong. Stood at 1,578 by September 1.

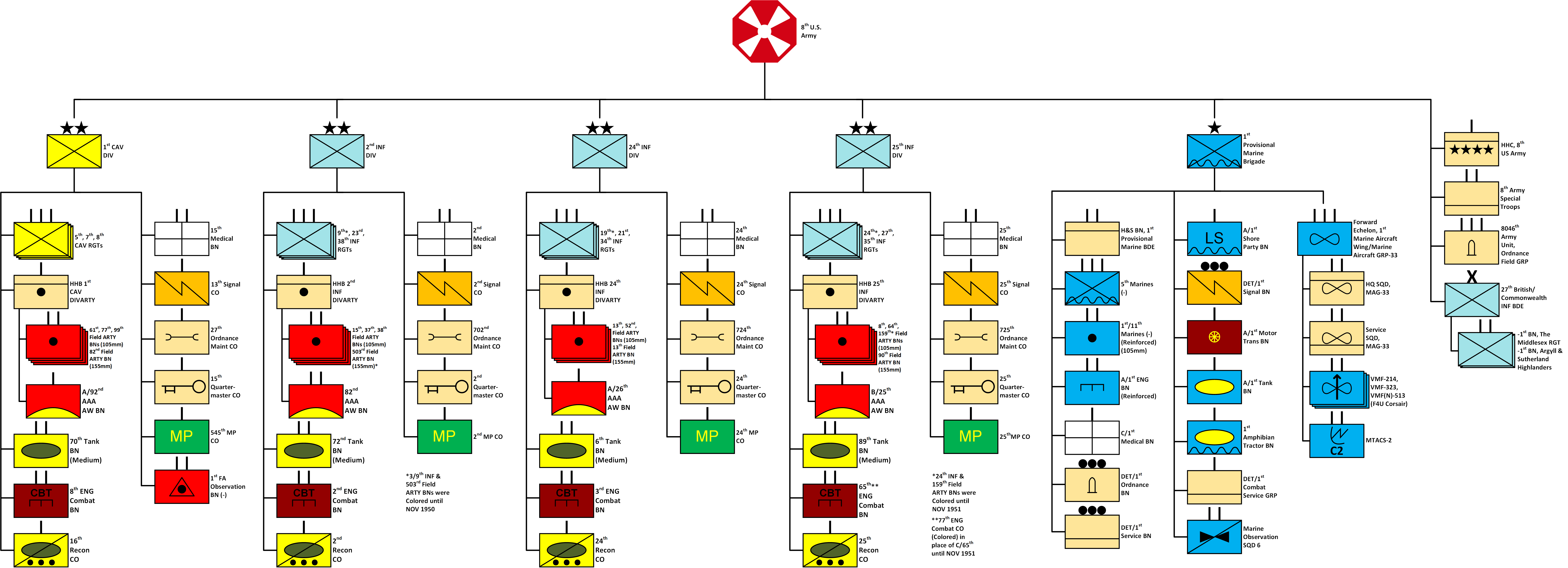
8th US Army as of 1 SEP 1950

==== ROK Army ====
(South Korea) Republic of Korea Army Minister of Defense: Shin Sung-mo Chief of Staff: Major General Chung Il-kwon
Unit	Commander	Sub-units	Notes
3rd Infantry Division	Brigadier General Lee Jun Shik	18th Regiment; 22nd Regiment; 23rd Regiment	Reported directly to ROK Army command. Reported a strength of 8,829 on July 26. Stood at 7,154 by September 1.
I Corps	Brigadier General Kim Hong-il		Headquarters reported a strength of 3,014 on July 26. Stood at 1,275 by September 1.
Capital Division	Brigadier General Kim Suk-won	1st Regiment; 17th Regiment; 18th Regiment	Reported strength of 6,644 July 26. Stood at 16,376 by September 1
8th Infantry Division	Colonel Lee Song Ga	10th Regiment; 16th Regiment; 21st Regiment	Reported strength of 8,864 July 26. Stood at 9,106 by September 1.
II Corps	Brigadier General Yu Jae Hung		Headquarters reported a strength of 976 on July 26. Stood at 499 by September 1.
1st Infantry Division	Brigadier General Paik Sun-yup	11th Regiment; 12th Regiment; 15th Regiment	Reported a strength of 7,601 on July 26. Stood at 10,482 by September 1.
6th Infantry Division	Colonel Kim Chong O	2nd Regiment; 7th Regiment; 19th Regiment	Reported a strength of 5,727 on July 26. Stood at 9,300 by September 1.

=== Air ===
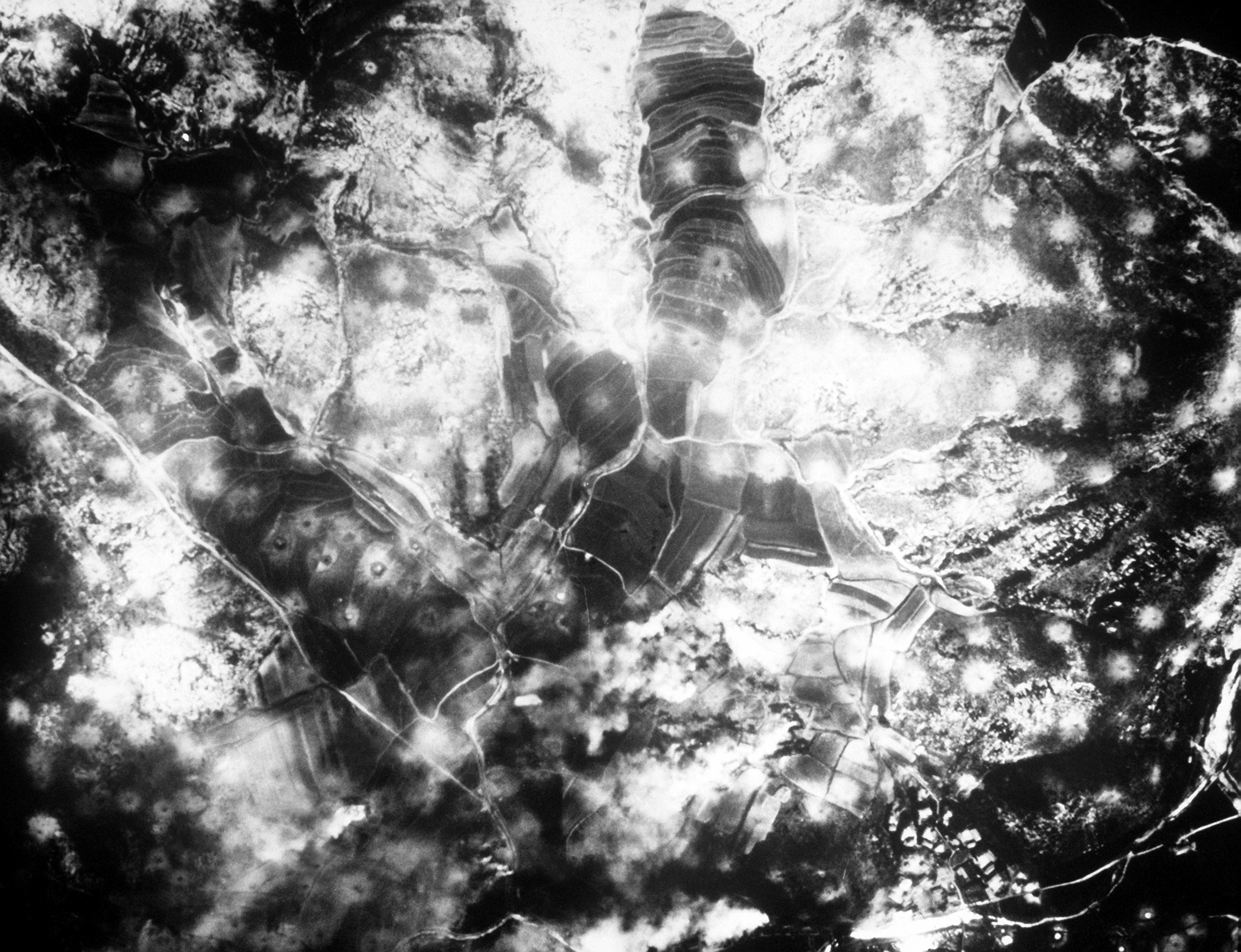
US Air Force bombers drop heavy ordnance near Waegwan

UN forces had a massive arsenal of air support at their disposal, provided by the US Air Force. This support was provided primarily by the Far East Air Forces (FEAF) and the Fifth Air Force, but US Navy and US Marine Corps aviation played a substantial role in supporting operations from the sea. UN Forces had complete control of the air and sea throughout the fight. and US Air Force and US Navy elements provided support for the ground units throughout the battle virtually unopposed. By the end of the battle the Eighth Army had more air support than General Omar Bradley's Twelfth United States Army Group in Europe during World War II.

By the end of July, the US had shipped a large number of aircraft of all types to Korea. On 30 July, the Far East Air Forces had 890 planes-626 F-80's and 264 F-51's-but only 525 of them were in units and available and ready for combat.

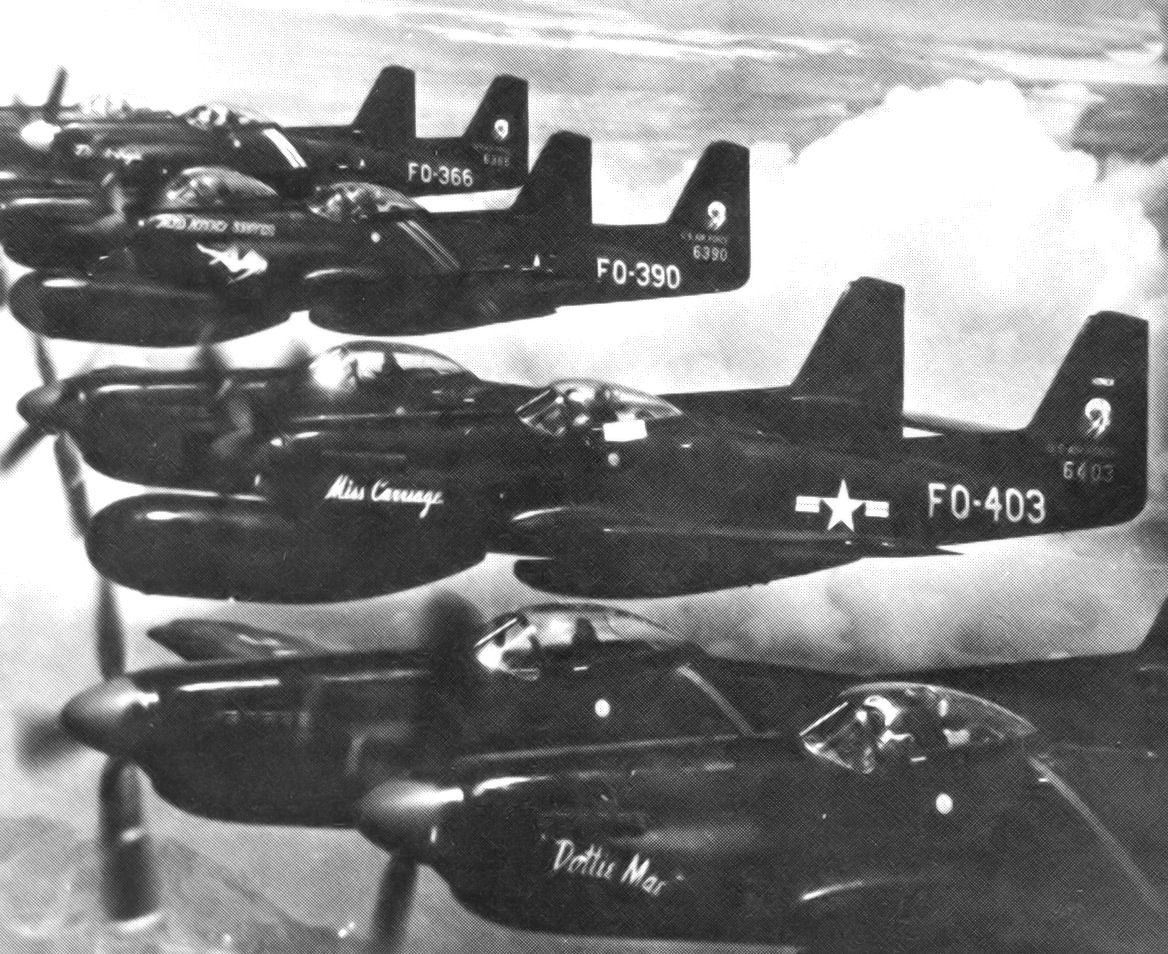
Flight of F-82 Twin Mustangs heading to Korea in June 1950

The Far East Air Force commanded a large contingent of long-range heavy bomber aircraft, and these assets were based in Japan, far from the North Koreans' striking range. Generally, the massive striking power was too unwieldy for the UN to use against the dispersed North Korean units, and the airpower of FEAF's B-29 Superfortresses was passed over in favor of smaller and more versatile fighter bombers of the Fifth Air Force. Under orders from MacArthur, however, the FEAF bomber command conducted one mission during the Pusan Perimeter fights.

On August 16, in the midst of the fight around Taegu, conducted one large carpet bombing operation northwest of Waegwan, where up to 40,000 North Korean troops were believed to be massing. The bombers from 10,000 feet dropped approximately 960 tons of 500- and 1,000-pound bombs. The attack had required the entirety of the FEAF bombing component, and they had dropped 3,084 500 pounds (230 kg) bombs and 150 1,000 pounds (450 kg) bombs. This comprised the largest Air Force operation since the Battle of Normandy in World War II.

General Walker reported to General MacArthur the next day that the damage done to the North Koreans by the bombing couldn't be evaluated because of smoke and dust, and ground forces couldn't reach it because of North Korean fire. Information obtained later from North Korean prisoners revealed the enemy divisions the Far East Command thought to be still west of the Naktong had already crossed to the east side and were not in the bombed area. No evidence was found that the bombing killed a single North Korean soldier.

However, the bombing seems to have destroyed a significant number of North Korean artillery batteries. The UN ground and air commanders opposed future massive carpet bombing attacks against enemy tactical troops unless there was precise information on an enemy concentration and the situation was critical. Instead, they recommended fighter-bombers and dive bombers would better support ground forces. They subsequently canceled a second bombing of an area east of the Naktong scheduled for August 19.

==== Far East Air Force and 5th Air Force ====
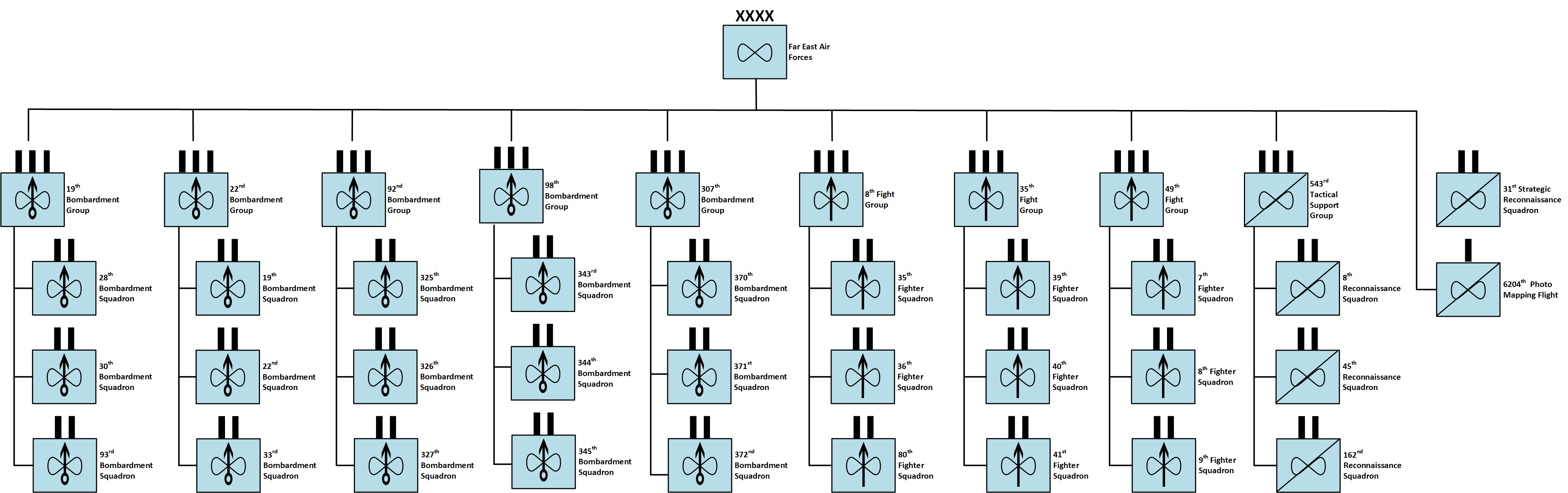
Far East Air Forces

Far East Air Forces Commander: Lieutenant General George E. Stratemeyer
Unit	Sub-units	Aircraft	Notes
19th Bombardment Group	28th Bombardment Squadron; 30th Bombardment Squadron; 93rd Bombardment Squadron	B-29 Superfortress	
22nd Bombardment Group	19th Bombardment Squadron; 22nd Bombardment Squadron; 33rd Bombardment Squadron	B-29 Superfortress	
92nd Bombardment Group	325th Bombardment Squadron; 326th Bombardment Squadron; 327th Bombardment Squadron	B-29 Superfortress	
98th Bombardment Group	343rd Bombardment Squadron; 344th Bombardment Squadron; 345th Bombardment Squadron	B-29 Superfortress	
307th Bombardment Group	370th Bombardment Squadron; 371st Bombardment Squadron; 372nd Bombardment Squadron	B-29 Superfortress	
8th Fighter Group	35th Fighter Squadron; 36th Fighter Squadron; 80th Fighter Squadron	F-80 Shooting Star, F-82 Twin Mustang	
35th Fighter Group	39th Fighter Squadron; 40th Fighter Squadron; 41st Fighter Squadron	F-82 Twin Mustang, F-94 Starfire, F-86 Sabre	
49th Fighter Group	7th Fighter Squadron; 8th Fighter Squadron; 9th Fighter Squadron	F-80 Shooting Star, F-86 Sabre	
543d Tactical Support Group	8th Reconnaissance Squadron; 45th Reconnaissance Squadron; 162nd Reconnaissance Squadron	RB-26 Invader, RF-80A Shooting Star, RF-51D Mustang	
31st Strategic Reconnaissance Squadron		RB-29 Superfortress	
6204th Photo Mapping Flight		RB-17G Flying Fortress	

==== Naval aircraft ====
The US Navy and Marine Corps aviation elements came to bear against the North Korean forces from five carriers during the battle: USS Valley Forge with Carrier Air Group 5, USS Philippine Sea with Carrier Air Group 11, HMS Triumph with two squadrons of the Fleet Air Arm, and two smaller carriers that supported Marine aircraft of the 1st Marine Aircraft Wing. Carrier Air Group 5 was the only Carrier-based air wing in the Far East at the time of the outbreak of war. Many of the pilots operating these aircraft were World War II veterans, however budget cuts following the end of the war had greatly reduced their training and readiness in the months before the war.

Early in the war, these aircraft were used primarily to conduct raids and gather intelligence on North Korean ground targets, focused on disrupting North Korean supply to the front lines. However, as soon as UN forces retreated to Pusan Perimeter following the Battle of Taejon, the Naval aircraft were immediately re purposed for close-air support and airstrikes against North Korean ground troops on the front. These missions were significantly more risky and the aircraft suffered much higher losses due to North Korean ground fire.

Unit	Sub-units	Notes
(United States) Carrier Air Group 5	Fighter Squadron 51 (F9F Panther); Fighter Squadron 52 (F9F Panther); Fighter Squadron 53 (F4U-4B Corsair); Fighter Squadron 54 (AD-1 Skyraider); Attack Squadron 55 (AD-1 Skyraider)	Based on USS Valley Forge
(United States) Carrier Air Group 11	Fighter Squadron 111 (F9F Panther); Fighter Squadron 112 (F9F Panther); Fighter Squadron 113 (F4U-4B Corsair); Fighter Squadron 114 (F4U-4B Corsair); Attack Squadron 115 (AD-1 Skyraider)	Based on USS Philippine Sea
(United Kingdom) 13th Carrier Air Group (Fleet Air Arm)	800 Naval Air Squadron (Fairey Firefly and Supermarine Seafire); 827 Naval Air Squadron (Fairey Firefly and Supermarine Seafire)	Based on HMS Triumph
(United States) Marine Aircraft Group 33	Marine Fighter Squadron 214 (F4U-4B Corsair); Marine Fighter Squadron 323 (F4U-4B Corsair); Marine Night Fighter Squadron 513 (F4U-5N Corsair and F7F Tigercat); Marine Observation Squadron 6 (OY-2 Observation craft and HO3S1 Helicopter); Marine Tactical Air Control Squadron 2 - Air Support Section co-located with Brigade CP	Part of 1st Marine Aircraft Wing. Based on USS Badoeng Strait and USS Sicily

=== Sea ===
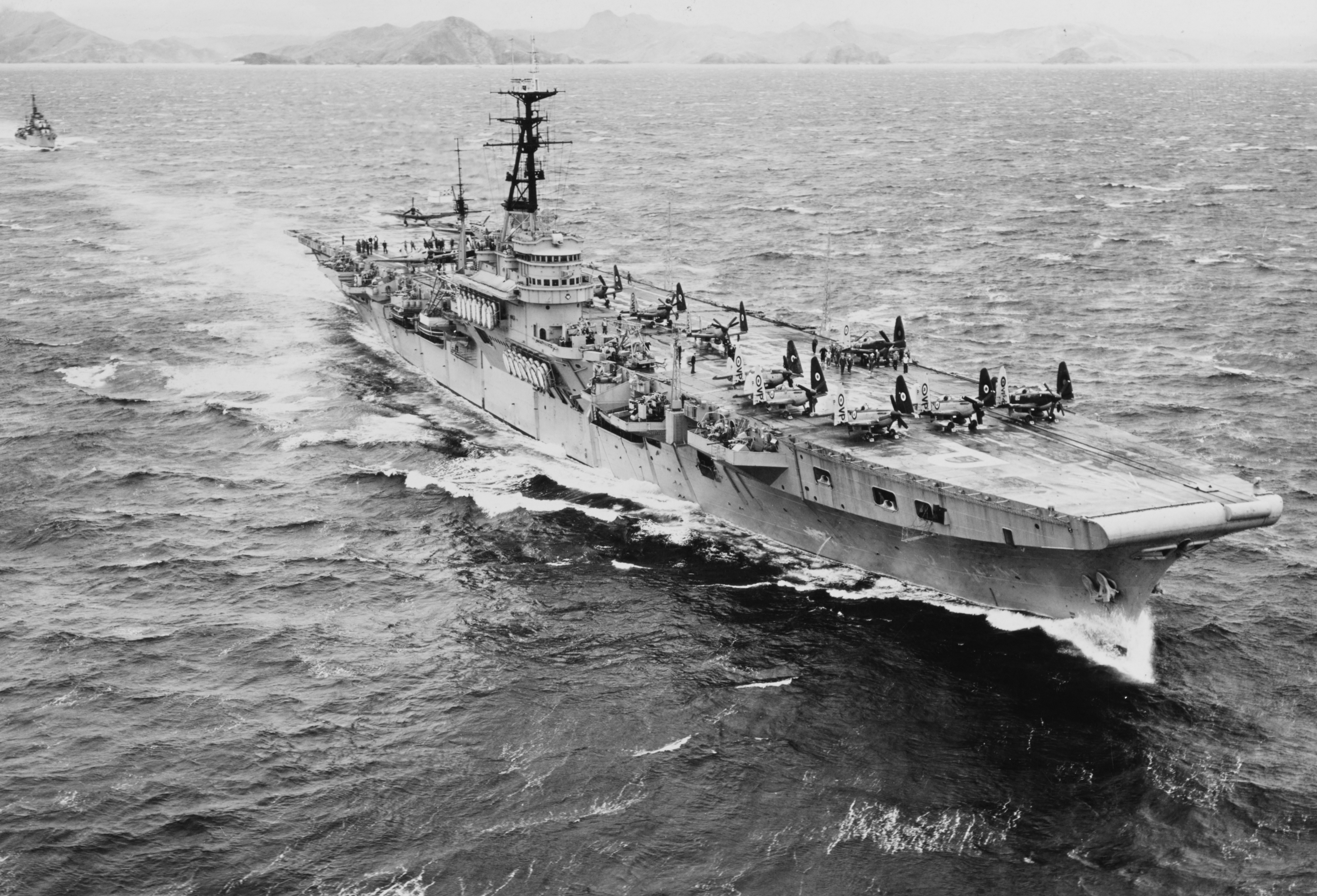
HMS Triumph embarks for Korea

The UN forces also had at their disposal a massive naval force of multi-national composition, which assisted in the defense of Pusan Perimeter at several crucial junctures. Ships of the fleet provided supporting artillery fire during pitched ground battles and provided a route of resupply and evacuation during other junctures. Multiple aircraft carriers provided bases for large contingents of aircraft that flew sorties and air strikes over North Korean ground forces.

UN ships continued to stream into the theater during and after the Pusan Perimeter engagement, and they played varying roles in support of the battle. The fleet was split into three primary groups; Task Force 77 formed the primary Aircraft carrier and striking component of the fleet, Task Force 96 consisted of a variety of smaller ships concerned with coastal bombardment, and Task Force 90 formed an attack transport squadron to assist in the evacuation and movement of ground troops.

Overall command of the naval force was taken by the US Seventh Fleet, and the bulk of the naval power provided was also from the US. The United Kingdom also provided a small naval task force including an aircraft carrier and several cruisers. Eventually, Australia, Canada and New Zealand provided ships as well. The Republic of Korea Navy itself was almost negligible during the battle. The South Koreans had a very small navy consisting of a few dozen minesweepers, LSTs, PT boats and other small craft donated to them by other UN member states. Compared to the larger UN fleet these craft played a very small role in the engagement, but North Korean naval ships, which were also very small, tended to target the ROK fleet more often.

==== US 7th Fleet ====
Under Vice Admiral Arthur D. Struble, Task Force 77 formed the core Carrier striking force of the UN forces. The force contained the UN aircraft carriers as well as a number of attendant escorts. The lineup of the escorts differed as ships were assigned roles in Task Force 96 during the course of the battle.

Ship name	Class	Notes
(United States) USS Valley Forge (CV-45)	Essex-class aircraft carrier	Arrived in theater in early July with Carrier Air Group 5.
(United States) USS Philippine Sea (CV-47)	Essex-class aircraft carrier	Arrived in theater August 5 with Carrier Air Group 11. Served as Task Force 77 flagship.
(United Kingdom) HMS Triumph (R16)	Colossus-class aircraft carrier	1st Aircraft Carrier Squadron, Far East Fleet. Arrived in theater July 1 with two squadrons of UK Fleet Air Arm.
(United States) USS Badoeng Strait (CVE-116)	Commencement Bay-class escort carrier	
(United States) USS Sicily (CVE-118)	Commencement Bay-class escort carrier	
(United States) USS Rochester (CA-124)	Oregon City-class heavy cruiser	
(United States) USS Saint Paul (CA-73)	Baltimore-class heavy cruiser	
(United States) USS Manchester (CL-83)	Cleveland-class light cruiser	
(United States) USS Worcester (CL-144)	Worcester-class light cruiser	
(United Kingdom) HMS Ceylon (C30)	Crown Colony-class light cruiser	Arrived in theater August 29.
(United Kingdom) HMS Belfast (C35)	Town-class light cruiser	Arrived in theater July 1.
(United States) USS Hollister (DD-788)	Gearing-class destroyer	
(United States) USS Borie (DD-704)	Allen M. Sumner-class destroyer	
(United States) USS John A. Bole (DD-755)	Allen M. Sumner-class destroyer	
(United States) USS Taussig (DD-746)	Allen M. Sumner-class destroyer	Arrived in theater July 2010
(United States) USS Doyle (DMS-34)	Gleaves-class destroyer	
(United States) USS Endicott (DD-495)	Gleaves-class destroyer	
(United States) USS Eversole (DD-789)	Gearing-class destroyer	
(United States) USS George K. MacKenzie (DD-836)	Gearing-class destroyer	
(United States) USS Gurke (DD-783)	Gearing-class destroyer	
(United States) USS Hamner (DD-718)	Gearing-class destroyer	
(United States) USS Henderson (DD-785)	Gearing-class destroyer	Arrived in theater August 19
(United States) USS Herbert J. Thomas (DD-833)	Gearing-class destroyer	Arrived in theater July 1950
(United States) USS Higbee (DDR-806)	Gearing-class destroyer	Arrived in theater June 1950
(United States) USS Ozbourn (DD-846)	Gearing-class destroyer	Arrived in theater August 1950
(United States) USS Wiltsie (DD-716)	Gearing-class destroyer	Arrived in theater August 1950
(United States) USS Fletcher (DDE-445)	Fletcher-class destroyer	Arrived in theater July 3.
(United Kingdom) HMS Cossack (R57)	C-class destroyer	Arrived in theater June 29.
(United Kingdom) HMS Consort (R76)	C-class destroyer	Arrived in theater June 29.
(United Kingdom) HMS Unicorn (I72)	Unicorn class	1st Aircraft Carrier Squadron, Far East Fleet. Arrived in theater August 29. Although able to operate as an aircraft carrier, she served in her usual role as an aircraft repair and maintenance carrier and was not actively engaged in combat.

Task Force 96, under Vice Admiral C. Turner Joy, was the largest organization of UN forces by number of ships. The force consisted primarily of cruisers, destroyers, and other smaller ships, which were used to blockade North Korean waterways and conduct coastal bombardments. Ships in this role would also periodically switch to Task Force 77, acting as a screen and escort for the UN aircraft carriers. This force was also the most diverse of the forces, as ships from five nations would eventually be assigned to it.

Ship name	Class	Notes
(United States) USS Helena (CA-75)	Baltimore-class heavy cruiser	
(United States) USS Juneau (CL-119)	Atlanta-class light cruiser	
(United Kingdom) HMS Jamaica (C44)	Crown Colony-class light cruiser	
(United Kingdom) HMS Kenya (C14)	Crown Colony-class light cruiser	Arrived in theater June 30.
(United Kingdom) HMS Belfast (C35)	Town-class light cruiser	Flagship of 1st Aircraft Carrier Squadron, Far East Fleet. Arrived in theater June 31.
(United States) USS De Haven (DD-727)	Allen M. Sumner-class destroyer	
(United States) USS Mansfield (DD-728)	Allen M. Sumner-class destroyer	
(United States) USS Lyman K. Swenson (DD-729)	Allen M. Sumner-class destroyer	
(United States) USS Soley (DD-707)	Allen M. Sumner-class destroyer	
(United States) USS Collett (DD-730)	Allen M. Sumner-class destroyer	
(United States) USS Samuel N. Moore (DD-747)	Allen M. Sumner-class destroyer	Arrived July 1950
(United States) USS Strong (DD-758)	Allen M. Sumner-class destroyer	Arrived in theater July 1
(United States) USS Shelton (DD-790)	Gearing-class destroyer	
(United States) USS Theodore E. Chandler (DD-717)	Gearing-class destroyer	
(United States) USS Wiltsie (DD-716)	Gearing-class destroyer	
(United States) USS Frank Knox (DDR-742)	Gearing-class destroyer	Arrived in theater July 1950.
(United States) USS Ernest G. Small (DD-838)	Gearing-class destroyer	
(United States) USS James E. Kyes (DD-787)	Gearing-class destroyer	
(United States) USS Hanson (DD-832)	Gearing-class destroyer	
(United States) USS Keppler (DD-765)	Gearing-class destroyer	Arrived in theater August 1950
(United States) USS Southerland (DD-743)	Gearing-class destroyer	Arrived in theater July 19.
(United States) USS Shields (DD-596)	Fletcher-class destroyer	
(United Kingdom) HMS Cockade (R34)	C-class destroyer	Arrived in theater July 1950.
(United Kingdom) HMS Charity (R29)	C-class destroyer	Arrived in theater July 1950.
(United Kingdom) HMS Comus (R43)	C-class destroyer	Arrived in theater July 1950.
(Australia) HMAS Bataan (I91)	Tribal-class destroyer	
(Canada) HMCS Sioux (R64)	V-class destroyer	
(Canada) HMCS Cayuga (R04)	Tribal-class destroyer	
(Canada) HMCS Athabaskan (R79)	Tribal-class destroyer	
(Netherlands) HNLMS Evertsen (G01)	S-class destroyer	
(Australia) HMAS Shoalhaven (K535)	River-class frigate	
(New Zealand) HMNZS Pukaki (F424)	Loch-class frigate	
(New Zealand) HMNZS Tutira (F420)	Loch-class frigate	
(United Kingdom) HMS Mounts Bay (K627)	Bay-class anti-aircraft frigate	Arrived in theater September 1950. Served primarily as an escort during the Battle of Inchon.
(United Kingdom) HMS Whitesand Bay (K633)	Bay-class anti-aircraft frigate	Arrived in theater September 11. Served primarily as a troop transport during the Battle of Inchon.
(United Kingdom) HMS Black Swan (L57)	Black Swan-class sloop (convoy escort)	Arrived in theater June 30.
(United Kingdom) HMS Alacrity (U60)	Black Swan-class sloop	Arrived in theater June 30.
(United Kingdom) HMS Hart (U58)	Black Swan-class sloop	Arrived in theater June 30.
(United Kingdom) HMS Alert (K647)	modified Bay-class frigate	An "Admiralty Yacht" or despatch vessel. Served as a headquarters ship.
(United Kingdom) HMHS Maine	Hospital ship	Served as the UN fleet's primary hospital ship
(United States) USS Remora (SS-487)	Tench-class submarine	Patrolled extreme north of Korean theater in the Soya Strait
(United States) USS Pickerel (SS-524)	Tench-class submarine	
(United States) USS Chatterer (AMS-40)	YMS-1-class minesweeper	
(United States) USS Mockingbird (AMS-27)	YMS-1-class minesweeper	
(United States) USS Osprey (AMS-28)	YMS-1-class minesweeper	
(United States) USS Redhead (AMS-34)	YMS-1-class minesweeper	

Task Force 90, under Rear Admiral James H. Doyle, was primarily concerned with amphibious operations in the theater. As such, it contained no combat ships, only attack transports and a large number of LSTs. The force consisted entirely of US ships. At least 15 LSTs were assigned to the force during the battle to support the attack transports.

Ship name	Class	Notes
(United States) USS Mount McKinley (AGC-7)	Mount McKinley-class command ship	
(United States) USS Cavalier (APA-37)	Bayfield-class attack transport	
(United States) USS Titania (AKA-13)	Arcturus-class attack cargo ship	
(United States) USS Oglethorpe (AKA-100)	Andromeda-class attack cargo ship	
(United States) USS Diphda (AKA-59)	Andromeda-class attack cargo ship	
(United States) USS Alshain (AKA-55)	Andromeda-class attack cargo ship	
(United States) USS Union (AKA-106)	Tolland-class attack cargo ship	
(United States) USS Arikara (AT-98)	Abnaki-class tug	
(United States) USS Diachenko (APD-123)	Crosley-class high speed transport	
(United States) USS Horace A. Bass (APD-124)	Crosley-class high speed transport	
(United States) USS Kite (AMS-22)	YMS-1-class minesweeper	Arrived in theater July 1950.

Additionally, a number of other combat ships were used to ferry weapons and supplies to the growing UN force during the battle. These ships were not deployed in a combat role in this battle, though some would later be moved to combat service later on in the war.

Ship name	Class	Notes
(United Kingdom) HMS Warrior (R31)	Colossus-class aircraft carrier	Carried additional aircraft for other carriers.
(United States) USS Boxer (CV-21)	Essex-class aircraft carrier	Carried aircraft for US Air Force units.
(United States) USS Segundo (SS-398)	Balao-class submarine	Ferried torpedoes and other weapons
(United States) USS Catfish (SS-339)	Balao-class submarine	Ferried torpedoes and other weapons
(United States) SS Luxembourg Victory	Liberty ship	Carried tanks for UN ground forces.
(United States) USNS Sgt. George D Keathley (T-APC-117)	Cargo ship	

== North Korean Forces ==
=== Land ===
The North Korean People's Army forces were organized into a mechanized combined arms force of ten divisions, originally numbering some 90,000 well-trained and well-equipped troops in July, with hundreds of T-34 Tanks. However, defensive actions by US and South Korean forces had delayed the North Koreans significantly in their invasion of South Korea, costing them 58,000 of their troops and a large number of tanks. To recoup these losses, the North Koreans had to rely on less experienced replacements and conscripts, many of whom they took from the conquered regions of South Korea. During the course of the battle, the North Koreans raised a total of 13 infantry divisions and one armored division to the fight at Pusan Perimeter.

From south to northeast, the North Korean units initially positioned opposite the UN units were the 83rd Motorized Regiment of the 105th Armored Division and then the 6th, 4th, 3rd, 2nd, 15th, 1st, 13th, 8th, 12th, and 5th Divisions and the 766th Independent Infantry Regiment.

=== North Korean People's Army ===
(North Korea) North Korean People's Army Commander-in-chief: Choi Yong-kun Commander, Advanced General Headquarters: Kim Chaek
Unit	Commander	Sub-units	Notes
I Corps	Lieutenant General Kim Ung		
2nd Infantry Division	Major General Lee Ch'ong Song	4th Infantry Regiment; 6th Infantry Regiment; 17th Infantry Regiment	Estimated strength of 7,500 on August 5. Stood at 6,000 by September 1.
3rd Infantry Division	Major General Lee Yong Ho	7th Infantry Regiment; 8th Infantry Regiment; 9th Infantry Regiment	Estimated strength of 6,000 on August 5. Stood at 7,000 by September 1.
4th Infantry Division	Major General Lee Kwon Mu	5th Infantry Regiment; 16th Infantry Regiment; 18th Infantry Regiment	Estimated strength of 7,000 on August 5. Reduced to 3,500 by August 19 after fighting at Naktong Bulge and did not recover until later in the war. Stood at 5,500 by September 1.
6th Infantry Division	Major General Pang Ho San	13th Infantry Regiment; 14th Infantry Regiment; 15th Infantry Regiment	Estimated strength of 3,600 on August 5. Stood at 10,000 by September 1.
7th Infantry Division	Major General Paek Nak Chil	30th Infantry Regiment; 31st Infantry Regiment; 32nd Infantry Regiment	Committed to Pusan around September 1 with a strength of 9,000.
9th Infantry Division	Major General Kim T'ae Mo	1st Infantry Regiment; 2nd Infantry Regiment; 3rd Infantry Regiment	Arrived in the battle around August 25. Stood at 9,350 by September 1.
10th Infantry Division	Major General Kim Tae Hong	25th Infantry Regiment; 27th Infantry Regiment; 29th Infantry Regiment	Stood at 7,500 by September 1.
II Corps	Lieutenant General Kim Mu Chong		
1st Infantry Division	Major General Hong Rim	20th Infantry Regiment; 22nd Infantry Regiment; 24th Infantry Regiment	Reported a strength of 5,000 on August 5. Stood at 5,000 by September 1.
5th Infantry Division	Major General Ma Sang Ch'ol	10th Infantry Regiment; 11th Infantry Regiment; 12th Infantry Regiment	Estimated strength of 6,000 on August 5. Stood at 7,000 by September 1.
8th Infantry Division	Major General Oh Paek Ryong	81st Infantry Regiment; 82nd Infantry Regiment; 83rd Infantry Regiment	Estimated strength of 8,000 on August 5. Stood at 6,500 by September 1.
12th Infantry Division	Major General Choi In	1st Infantry Regiment; 2nd Infantry Regiment; 3rd Infantry Regiment	Estimated strength of 6,000 on August 5. Reduced to 1,500 men after fighting at P'ohang-dong, and re-formed August 19 by merging with the 766th Regiment to stand at 5,000 men. Stood at 5,000 by September 1.
13th Infantry Division	Major General Choi Yong Chin	19th Infantry Regiment; 21st Infantry Regiment; 23rd Infantry Regiment	Estimated strength of 9,500 on August 5. Stood at 9,000 by September 1.
15th Infantry Division	Major General Paik Son Choi	45th Infantry Regiment; 48th Infantry Regiment; 50th Infantry Regiment	Estimated strength of 5,000 on August 5. Stood at 7,000 by September 1.
105th Armored Division	Major General Ryu Kyong Su	107th Tank Regiment; 109th Tank Regiment; 203rd Tank Regiment; 206th Infantry Regiment; 83rd Motorized Regiment	The 105th's units formed the core of North Korea's mechanized and armored forces, and was dispersed supporting the other divisions in the line. Its total strength was estimated at 4,000 on August 5. Stood at 1,000 by September 1 as assets were transferred to the 104th Security Brigade, and 16th and 17th Armored Brigades.
766th Independent Infantry Regiment	Senior Colonel Oh Jin Woo	1st Battalion; 2nd Battalion; 3rd Battalion	Estimated strength of 1,500 by August 5. Disbanded August 19 after fighting in P'ohang-dong and merged with NK 12th Division.

=== Air and Sea ===
The Korean People's Navy controlled a very small force of around 50 or 60 ships, all of which were small ships. The navy possessed a few torpedo boats and gunboats among others, some of which were donated by the Soviet Union, but these ships were no match for the UN naval forces. Following the Battle of Chumonchin Chan, a one-sided engagement in which UN forces ambushed and crushed a small North Korean flotilla, North Korean ships generally avoided UN ships completely, leaving the UN naval forces virtually unopposed. North Korean torpedo boats may have conducted isolated attacks against similarly small South Korean ships but they did not oppose larger UN ships during the fight around the Pusan Perimeter. They could also not find resupply from Soviet or China as neither had a large standing navy in the region. This is seen by historians as one of the largest disadvantages North Korea had during the battle, as it allowed the UN complete sea and air superiority.

At the start of the Korean War in July, the Korean People's Air Force consisted of about 150 combat aircraft. This force was a mixture of Russian-built models and generally were in poor maintenance and repair. Fighter aircraft included Yakovlev Yak-7s, Yak-3s and a few Yak-9s, 70 in total. They controlled a handful of Ilyushin Il-10 for air-to-surface combat, and used Polikarpov Po-2 biplanes for training. These craft were poorly maintained and their pilots were eager but mostly untrained. However, the North Korean ground forces had much more modern equipment, including Anti-aircraft weapons and vehicles, which were more effective in threatening UN aircraft. North Korean aircraft engaged US aircraft in small, isolated dogfights throughout the battle, but the North Koreans were unable to muster a sufficient force of fighters to the front to seriously oppose the massive UN air component.
