= Battle of Onjong =

Battle between Chinese and United Nations forces

Coordinates: 40°6′33″N 125°53′47″E

- Part of the Korean War
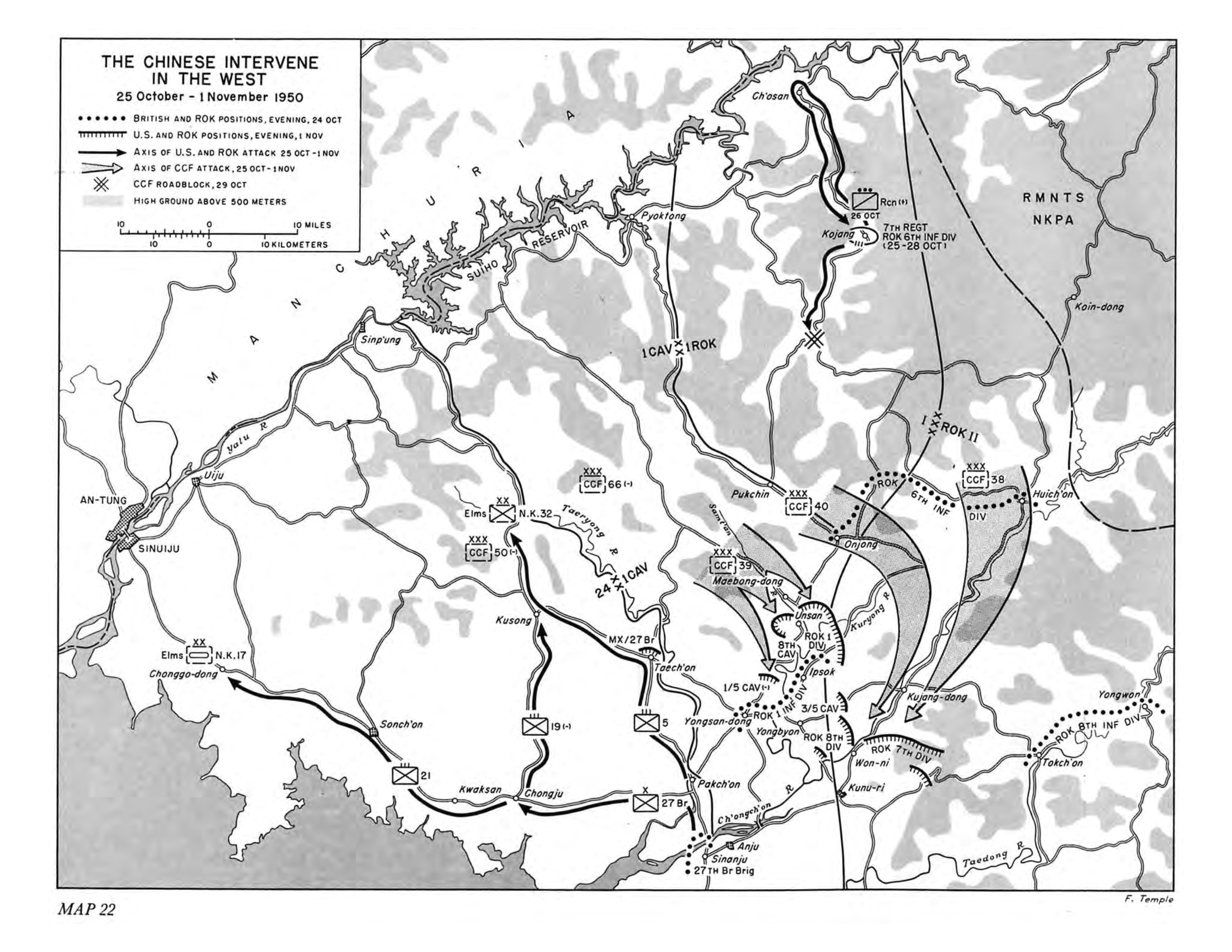
- Map of Chinese intervention, 25 October 25 – 1 November 1950
Date	25–29 October 1950
Location	Near Onjong, North Korea
Result	Chinese victory

Belligerents
China	South Korea

Commanders and leaders
Peng Dehuai; Han Xianchu; Wen Yuchen (40th Corps)	Yu Jae-hung (II Corps); Kim Jong-oh (6th Div); Go Geun Hong (10th Rgt)

Units involved
40th Corps (Note: In Chinese military nomenclature, the term "Army" (军) means Corps, while the term "Army Group" (集团军) means Army.): 118th Division; 119th Division; 120th Division	II Corps: 6th Infantry Division; 10th Infantry Regiment

Casualties and losses
Unknown	Unknown

The Battle of Onjong (Korean: 온정리 전투), also known as the Battle of Wenjing (Chinese: 温井战斗; pinyin: Wēnjǐng zhàndòu), was one of the first engagements between Chinese and South Korean forces during the Korean War. It took place around Onjong in present-day North Korea from 25 to 29 October 1950. During the Chinese First Phase Campaign, the People's Volunteer Army (PVA) 40th Corps ambushed and defeated elements of the Republic of Korea Army (ROKA) II Corps near Onjong.

== Background ==
The Korean War began on 25 June 1950 when the North Korean Korean People's Army (KPA) attacked South Korea. The invasion was almost successful in conquering all of South Korea until the United Nations (UN) intervened, sending ground forces into the country under the command of the United States. The ROKA/UN forces initially experienced early defeats until the Battle of the Pusan Perimeter, where the ROKA/UN forces reversed the KPA's momentum. By October 1950, the KPA was effectively destroyed by the ROKA/UN forces after the landing at Inchon, the breakout from the Pusan Perimeter and the UN September 1950 counteroffensive. Despite the strong objections from the People's Republic of China on North Korea's northern border, the US Eighth Army crossed the 38th Parallel and advanced towards the Sino-Korean border at the Yalu River. As part of the offensive to end the war, ROKA II Corps, comprising the 6th, 7th and 8th Infantry Divisions, was ordered to attack north towards the Yalu River through the village of Onjong on 23 October 1950.

In response to the UN advances, Chinese Communist Party chairman Mao Zedong, ordered the People's Liberation Army's North East Frontier Force to enter North Korea and engage UN forces under the name People's Volunteer Army (PVA). In order to stabilize the rapidly collapsing Korean front and to push back the advancing ROKA/UN forces, Mao authorized the First Phase Campaign, a bridgehead-building operation with the aim of destroying the ROKA II Corps, the vanguard and the right flank of the US Eighth Army, advancing up along the Taebaek Mountains in the middle of the peninsula. After the Chinese leadership finally settled the issue of armed intervention on October 18, Mao ordered the PVA to enter Korea on 19 October under strict secrecy.

== Prelude ==
=== Locations and terrain ===
Onjong is a crossroad village located at the lower Ch'ongch'on River Valley, 10 mi (16 km) northeast of Unsan. At the east of Onjong stands the town of Huich'on, the staging area of ROKA II Corps for the offensive. To the north, Onjong is linked to the town of Kojang, which is located at 50 mi (80 km) away from the Yalu River. Because of the hilly terrain at the Sino-Korean Border, Onjong is one of the few access points into the Yalu River area. The terrain also limits troop movements while providing ideal grounds for ambushes.

=== Forces and strategy ===
On 24 October the ROKA 6th Infantry Division advanced westward from Huich'on, and Onjong was captured on the same day. From Onjong, the 7th Infantry Regiment, 6th Infantry Division turned north and advanced towards Kojang, while the 2nd Infantry Regiment, 6th Infantry Division planned to advance northwest from Onjong towards Pukchin. Because the UN Command expected no opposition from the destroyed KPA, the advances were not coordinated between the ROKA/UN units. As a result, the ROKA 7th Infantry Regiment managed to wander into enemy territory without much opposition, completely oblivious to the new threats surrounding them.

While the ROKA were advancing towards the Yalu River, the PVA were also trying to deploy their units for the upcoming First Phase Campaign. As the PVA Commander Peng Dehuai scrambled to set up his new command post at Taeyudong, the planned advance by the ROKA 2nd Infantry Regiment threatened to overrun his position. Without any KPA units nearby to hide the presence of the PVA, Peng was forced to start the First Phase Campaign early by moving the PVA 40th Corps to intercept the 2nd Infantry Regiment near Onjong. On the night of 24 October the PVA 118th Division of 40th Corps arrived at its designated blocking position. Meanwhile, the PVA had set up numerous ambush positions on the ridges overlooking the Onjong-Pukchin road.

== Battle ==
=== Initial contacts ===
On the morning of 25 October and with its 3rd Battalion on point, the 2nd Infantry Regiment started to advance northwest towards Pukchin. The ROKA soon came under fire 8 mi (13 km) to the west of Onjong. The 3rd Battalion dismounted from their vehicles to disperse what they thought would be a small force of KPA, but the two PVA regiments on the high ground immediately began pouring heavy fire onto the ROKA left, front and right flanks. The 3rd Battalion broke instantly, abandoning most of its vehicles and artillery along the way. About 400 survivors managed to escape the trap and fall back into Onjong.

When the 2nd Infantry Regiment learned that the 3rd Battalion was under heavy attack, its 2nd Battalion was moved forward to support the 3rd Battalion while its 1st Battalion was sent back to Onjong. Although the 2nd Battalion was turned back after encountering strong resistances, the ROKA managed to capture several Chinese prisoners who revealed that there were nearly 10,000 Chinese soldiers waiting down the road. At the same time, the PVA High Command ordered the PVA 120th Division of 40th Corps to join the battle while the rest of the 40th Corps was busy setting up roadblocks around Onjong. With all the roadblocks in place by midnight, the PVA 118th Division and one regiment from the PVA 120th Division attacked Onjong on 26 October at 03:30, and the 2nd Infantry Regiment was dispersed within 30 minutes. Although Colonel Ham Byung Sun, commander of the 2nd Infantry Regiment, managed to rally his troops 5 km (3.1 mi) east of Onjong, the PVA were still able to penetrate the new position within an hour. At this point not a single company of the regiment was left intact, and the 2nd Infantry Regiment ceased to be an organized unit. Approximately 2,700 men of the 3,100 in the regiment eventually escaped to the Ch'ongch'on River. Two US Army Korean Military Advisory Group (KMAG) advisors were also captured.

=== Second ambush ===
The loss of surprise due to the early start of the First Phase Campaign greatly disappointed Mao. Nevertheless, Mao still urged Peng to destroy the ROKA by baiting them with trapped units. At the same time, Major general Yu Jae-hung, commander of ROKA II Corps, sent the 19th Infantry Regiment, 6th Infantry Division (under Colonel Park Kwang Hyuk) and the 10th Infantry Regiment, 8th Infantry Division (under Colonel Go Geun Hong) to recapture Onjong and to salvage the lost equipment from the battle. The 7th Infantry Regiment, under the command of Colonel Im Pu Taek, was also ordered to retreat south with the 6th Infantry Division. Hoping to draw the rest of ROKA II Corps into the open, Peng ordered the PVA 118th Division to swing north and to trap the retreating 7th Infantry Regiment, while the PVA 119th and 120th Divisions would wait to ambush any rescue forces passing through Onjong. On October 27, the PVA 118th Division isolated the 7th Infantry Regiment by cutting the road between Kojang and Onjong, but the 7th Infantry Regiment did not reach the roadblock due to the lack of fuel. Upon realizing that ROKA II Corps had not fallen for the deception, Peng ordered the 119th and the 120th Divisions to destroy the 10th and 19th Infantry Regiments. On the night of 28 October, the ambush by the two PVA divisions quickly decimated the advancing ROKA regiments at the east of Onjong, and the PVA roadblocks in the rear areas forced the ROKA soldiers to abandon all vehicles and artillery in order to escape.

The 7th Infantry Regiment had now become the only surviving formation of the 6th Infantry Division, but it too was ambushed by the PVA 118th Division on 29 October 20 mi (32 km) south of Kojang. The PVA 118th Division was ordered to wait for reinforcements from the 50th Corps, but the 118th Division attacked alone on the night of 29 October to prevent the ROKA from escaping. After a two-hour battle, the 7th Infantry Regiment was forced to disperse with its survivors scattered into the hills. About 875 officers and 3,552 other soldiers managed to escape, while Major Harry Fleming of the KMAG was wounded 15 times and was later captured by the PVA.

== Aftermath ==
With the loss of the 6th Infantry Division and the 10th Infantry Regiment, ROKA II Corps was devastated, and effectively ceased to be an organized fighting force. This meant the right flank of the US Eighth Army was completely open to the PVA, which were now advancing south to overwhelm the ROKA/UN forces. Exploiting the situation, the PVA launched another attack on the now exposed Eighth Army center, resulting in the loss of the ROKA 15th Infantry Regiment and the US 8th Cavalry Regiment at the Battle of Unsan. With the PVA pouring into the rear of the UN lines, the Eighth Army was forced to retreat to the Ch'ongch'on River. Only the stubborn defense of Kunu-ri by the US 5th Regimental Combat Team and the ROKA 7th Infantry Division on 4 November managed to stop the PVA advance and prevented a disastrous defeat for the Eighth Army. By 5 November logistics difficulties forced the PVA to end the First Phase Campaign.

Although the PVA were unable to exploit the breakthrough in the UN lines, the weakness of ROKA II Corps on the Eighth Army's right flank was exposed to the PVA commanders. During the planning of the PVA Second Phase Offensive, Peng would again focus his attention towards ROKA II Corps at the Eighth Army's right flank, resulting in a disastrous defeat for the UN forces at the Battle of the Ch'ongch'on River. To commemorate this battle as China's official entry into the Korean War, 25 October is currently the War to Resist America and Aid Korea Memorial Day in China.

== Notes ==
Footnotes

Citations
