= Battle of Chuncheon =

1950 battle of the Korean War

Coordinates: 37°52′N 127°44′E

- Part of Korean War
Date	25–30 June 1950
Location	Chuncheon
Result	North Korean victory: Successful ROK withdrawal

Belligerents
North Korea	South Korea

Commanders and leaders
Kim Kwang-hyop; Lee Cheong-song; Jeon Woo; Park Sung-chul	Kim Jong-oh

Strength
II Corps: 2nd Infantry Division; 7th Infantry Division; 15th Infantry Division	6th Infantry Division; 16th Artillery Battalion

The Battle of Chuncheon (Korean: 춘천 전투) was one of a series of coordinated attacks beginning on 25 June 1950 that marked the beginning of the Korean War.

The 6th Infantry Division of South Korea conducted a defense war for six days in Chuncheon and Hongcheon, delaying II Corps of North Korea's advance to the areas. Eventually, North Korea conquered Hongcheon on June 30.

The battle destroyed much of the city. Catholic priest Anthony Collier ignored orders from his bishop to withdraw from the city and remained to tend to the wounded. He was killed by North Korean troops two days after the battle.
