= 40th Group Army =

- Active: c.1949 – 2017
- Country: People's Republic of China
- Allegiance: Chinese Communist Party
- Branch: People's Liberation Army Ground Force
- Part of: People's Liberation Army
- Garrison/HQ: Jinzhou, Liaoning

Commanders
- Current commander: Zhang Xuefeng (张学锋)
- Notable commanders: Han Xianchu

The 40th Group Army was a military formation of the People's Liberation Army, active in various forms from 1949 to 2017. It was last located in the Shenyang Military Region and the Northern Theater Command.

== History ==
=== Korean War ===
During the Korean War, the 40th Army was part of the People's Volunteer Army. It was composed of the 118th, 119th, and 120th Divisions.

In the morning of Oct. 25, the 118th Division of the 40th Army ambushed the 3rd Infantry Battalion of ROK 6th Division, destroying the ROK unit as an organized force.

The 40th Army attacked the 9th and 38th Infantry Regiments of the U.S. 2nd Infantry Division about eighteen miles northeast of Kunu-ri along the Chongchon River.

=== 1989 Tiananmen Square protests and massacre ===
In May 1989, the 40th Army's 118th Infantry Division and Artillery Brigade were deployed to Beijing to enforce martial law and suppress the 1989 Tiananmen Square protests.
