= Myeongseongsan =

Mountain in South Korea

Coordinates: 38°06′25″N 127°20′16″E

Highest point
- Elevation: 922.6 m (3,027 ft)

Geography
- Location: South Korea

Korean name
- Hangul: 명성산
- Hanja: 鳴聲山
- RR: Myeongseongsan
- MR: Myŏngsŏngsan

Myeongseongsan (Korean: 명성산) is a mountain in South Korea. Its area extends across Pocheon, Gyeonggi Province and Cheorwon County, Gangwon Province. It has an elevation of 922.6 m (3,027 ft).

== See also ==
- List of mountains in Korea
