= Unsan (disambiguation) =

Unsan is a county in North Pyongan, North Korea.

Unsan may also refer to:

- Unsan (town), the town in Unsan County in North Pyongan, North Korea
- Battle of Unsan, a 1950 battle in Unsan, North Pyongan
- Unsan County, South Pyongan, a county in South Pyongan, North Korea
