= Gakheulsan =

Mountain in South Korea

Highest point
- Elevation: 838 m (2,749 ft)
- Coordinates: 38.11613°N 127.37443°E

Geography
- Location: South Korea

Korean name
- Hangul: 각흘산
- Hanja: 角屹山
- RR: Gakheulsan
- MR: Kakhŭlsan

Gakheulsan (Korean: 각흘산) is a mountain in South Korea. Its area extends across Pocheon, Gyeonggi Province and Cheorwon County in Gangwon Province. Gakheulsan has an elevation of 838 m (2,749 ft).

== See also ==
- List of mountains in Korea
