= Battle of White Horse Hill =

1952 battle of the Korean War

Coordinates: 38°17′24″N 127°09′00″E

- Part of the Korean War
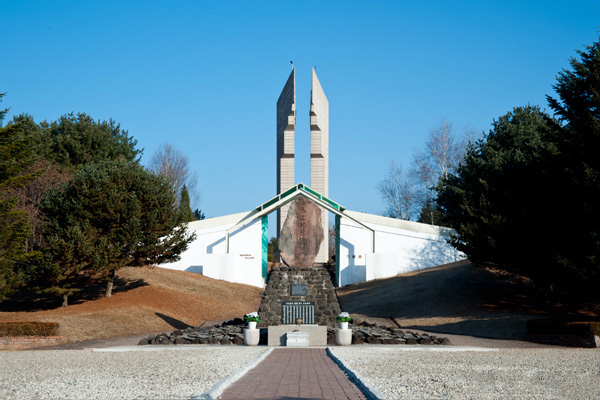
- White Horse Hill memorial
Date	October 6–15, 1952
Location	Northwest of Cheorwon, Korea
Result	United Nations victory

Belligerents
United Nations (UNC): South Korea; United States	China

Commanders and leaders
(First Republic of Korea) Kim Jong-oh	Jiang Yonghui

Units involved
(First Republic of Korea) 9th Infantry Division (United States) Fifth Air Force	38th Corps: 334th Regiment; 339th Regiment; 340th Regiment; 342nd Regiment

Casualties and losses
South Korean sources: 3,500; Chinese estimation: 9,300	Chinese sources: 1,768 killed 3,062 wounded 562 missing South Korean estimation: 10,000

The Battle of White Horse Hill (Korean: 백마고지 전투, Chinese: 白马山战役; pinyin: Báimǎshān Zhànyì)took place during the Korean War. White Horse Hill (Hill 395) in the Iron Triangle, formed by Pyonggang at its peak and Gimhwa-eup and Cheorwon-eup at its base, a strategic transportation route in the central region of the Korean peninsula.

White Horse Hill was the crest of a 395-metre (1,296 ft) forested hill mass that extended in a northwest-to-southeast direction for about 2 miles (3.2 km), part of the area controlled by the U.S. IX Corps, and considered an important outpost hill with a good command over the Yokkok-chon Valley, dominating the western approaches to Cheorwon. Loss of the hill would force IX Corps to withdraw to the high ground south of the Yokkok-chon in the Cheorwon area, denying the IX Corps use of the Cheorwon road net and would open up the entire Cheorwon area to enemy attack and penetration.

== Background ==
On October 3, 1952, a defecting lieutenant from the Chinese People's Volunteer Army (PVA) 340th Regiment, 114th Division under interrogation revealed that an attack on White Horse Hill was imminent.

Being corroborated by other intelligence, IX Corps reinforced the ROK 9th Infantry Division with 22 tanks from the 53rd Tank Squadron and the U.S. 73rd Tank Battalion's C Company, artillery, rocket launchers, and antiaircraft weapons to be used in a ground role. 9th Division commander Major General Kim Jong-oh stationed the 30th Regiment under Regimental Commander Im Ik-sun in charge of the left flank and the 29th Regiment under Commander Kim Bongcheol in charge of the right flank on the threatened hill and held the 28th Regiment under Commander Lee Ju-il in reserve. On the flanks of White Horse Hill he positioned the tanks and antiaircraft guns to cover the valley approaches. Searchlights and flares were distributed to provide illumination at night, and a flare plane was made available to supply additional light on call during the hours of darkness. From the Fifth Air Force came extra air strikes against enemy artillery positions adjacent to White Horse Hill.

== Battle ==
On 9 October an intensive air raid was carried out on several places around Baengma-goji where the PVA were anticipated to assemble. The PVA responded by opening the floodgates of the Pongnae-Ho Reservoir, which was located about 7 miles (11 km) north of the hill, evidently in the hope that the Yokkokchon which ran between the ROK 9th and the U.S. 2nd Infantry Division would rise sufficiently to block reinforcements during the critical period. Simultaneously, they threw a battalion-sized force at Arrowhead Hill (Hill 281), 2 miles (3.2 km) southeast of White Horse Hill across the valley, to pin down the French Battalion astride the hill and to keep the 2nd Division occupied. Before the night was over six additional companies joined in the action. The French held firm and inflicted heavy casualties upon the attackers. As a diversion to the main attack, it proved effective but expensive.

At 19:15, the PVA 340th Regiment sent four companies up to the northwest end of the White Horse Hill complex to engage the 10th Company and its supporting forces in an attempt to secure a break-through. At 02:00 the following morning, four B-29 strategic bombers dropped 1,000 pound bombs on Hajinmyeong-dong, and an assortment of 81 artillery guns (32 155-millimeter guns 213th Field Artillery Battalion, 32 105-millimeter guns, 7 4.2-inch heavy mortars and 10 tank guns) dealt intensive heavy fire; nevertheless, the PVA breakthrough widened further, though suffering an estimated 500 casualties the first night. Disregarding the heavy losses, the Chinese committed the remnants of the original two battalions and reinforced them with two fresh battalions from the same division the following day. Cutting off a ROK company outpost, the PVA pressed on and forced the elements of the ROK 10th Company to withdraw from the crest. Less than two hours after the loss of the peak, the 2nd and 3rd Battalions of the ROK 28th Regiment mounted a night attack that swept the PVA out of the old ROK positions by 23:05. Again the Chinese losses were heavy and a prisoner later related that many of the companies committed to the attack were reduced from 190-200 to less than 20 men after the second day of fighting.

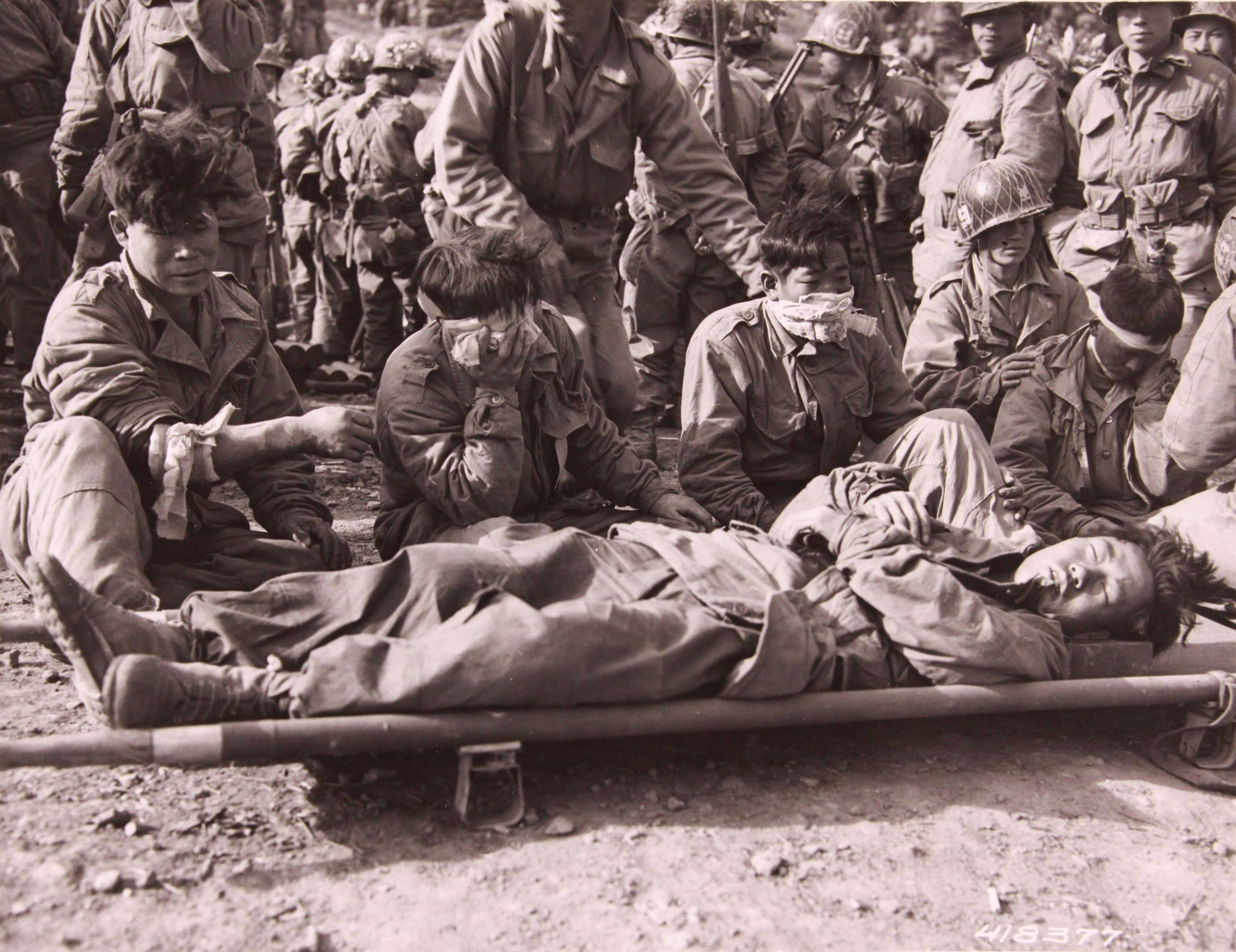
ROK 9th Division casualties await evacuation

With such serious losses, the PVA switched its attack forces from the 340th Regiment to the 334th Regiment, reserving the 342nd Regiment for the assault on October 9. Elements of the 342nd fought their way to the crest during the afternoon of 9 October, only to lose it to a ROK 28th Regiment counterattack that night. On 10 October the still fresh 29th Regiment made a counterattack and seized White Horse Hill and the 28th Regiment was immediately assigned to defend the right flank of the hill. The same day at 04:30, the PVA 342nd Regiment recaptured the hill in an attack on the ROK 29th Regiment that had been defending the main peak; in two hours, though, the hill was seized back in an instant counterattack, only to be lost again at 08:15. In the tiresome war of attrition, the UN forces relied on their overwhelming advantage in artillery support and close-range air support. The UN forces apparently were fortunate, for a Chinese prisoner later related that Fifth Air Force planes had caught elements of the 335th Regiment, 112th Division, in an assembly area north of Hill 395, inflicting heavy casualties upon the regiment, and had delayed its commitment to the attack.

Regardless of casualties, the PVA continued to send masses of infantry to take the objective. On White Horse Hill, the PVA kept funneling their combat troops into the northern attack approaches where Eighth Army artillery, tanks, and air power would wreak havoc. The Chinese determination to win White Horse Hill made sitting ducks out of their infantry as the IX Corps defenders saturated the all-out assaults with massed firepower of every caliber.

By 12 October there was a break in the bitter struggle. The 1st Battalion of the 30th Regiment struck out from the attack line. The 29th Regiment, which had mounted a counterattack four hours before the attack by the battalion, was stalled just 40 meters from the PVA position. When no progress was made in the two-hour attack, the 2nd Battalion was sent in on the right flank for a pincer movement. The 3rd company which was in the vanguard of the 1st Battalion was not making sufficient advances because of PVA resistance, so the commander of the 1st company, close behind the 3rd company, was ordered to launch an overriding attack and succeeded in approaching the attack line. White Horse Hill was recaptured at 13:20, after five-hours of intense battle.

On 13 October under close-range air cover by 141 warplanes, the 28th Regiment was committed to Nakta-neungaseon, but the strong PVA resistance forced it to withdraw to White Horse Hill six hours after the attack on the ridge had begun. On October 14, the 29th Regiment executed another attack, and at 10:40, the 22nd Battalion of the Regiment routed the PVA troops from Nakta-neungseon, thus seizing full control of White Horse Hill. Chinese sources claim that the 38th Army was ordered during the night of the 14th to abandon the action due to the start of the Battle of Triangle Hill which the PVA was determined to win.

== Aftermath ==
The 38th Army committed four regiments - the 334th, 339th, 340th, and 342nd. The Chinese claimed they had suffered a total of 6,700 casualties. South Korean sources claim that the 38th Army committed seven regiments out of its total of nine regiments and sustained a total of 14,332 casualties (8,234 identified deaths, 5,097 presumed deaths, 1,001 wounded, and 57 prisoners). The ROK 9th Infantry Division committed three regiments - the 28th, 29th, and 30th and suffered a total of 3,422 casualties (505 dead, 2,562 injured and 391 missing), plus over 400 more casualties in the 1st Battalion of the 30th Regiment. Chinese sources claim that the 9th Infantry Division committed four regiments and suffered a total of 9,400 casualties with almost 7,000 identified deaths. Both the 38th Army and the 9th Infantry Division, after suffering heavy casualties, had to withdraw to the rear. Following the battle, the ROK 9th Division gained the nickname White Horse Division.

The U.S. Fifth Air Force made a total of 745 sorties and poured more than 2,700 bombs of various kinds, together with over 358 napalm bombs, onto the hill. Chinese forces rained no less than 55,000 shells during the nine-day battle period and the South Korean forces fired over 185,000 shells.

Nine sets of remains of Korean War MIA servicemen were discovered at Arrowhead Hill, aka Hill 281 during minesweeping operations between October and November 2018. Arrowhead Hill had previously been selected for both Koreas to jointly conduct a pilot remains recovery project. On 27 September 2020, South Korea handed over 117 remains at Incheon Airport. Cui Jonggeon, the first official of the Ministry of Foreign Affairs of South Korea, and Chang Zhengguo, Vice Minister of Veterans Affairs of China attended the ceremony. The remains had been excavated in Arrow Hill (the battle area of the Battle of White Horse) in the North Korean Demilitarized Zone in 2019. A Yun-20 plane carried the remains. After they had arrived in China, three of the remains were identified using relics.

== Naming of White Horse Hill ==
Since 8 October 1952, South Korean press used "White Horse Hill" instead of Hill 395 in stories about the battle. Two possible origins of the name are:

- Firstly, the hill changed hands 24 times after repeated attacks and counterattacks with heavy bombardments for its possession. Afterwards, Hill 395 looked like a threadbare white horse, thence its name of Baekma, meaning a white horse.
- Secondly, many parachute flares burst around Hill 395 in the night battles and a British war correspondent compared Hill 395 to Whitehorse Hill in the Berkshire Downs in Oxfordshire, England. "White Horse Hill" was subsequently used in the American news agency Associated Press, International News Service since October 7.

== See also ==
- Battle of Arrowhead Hill
