= Korean Workers' Party Headquarters, Cheorwon =

Former building in North Korea

- 철원 노동당사 (Korean)
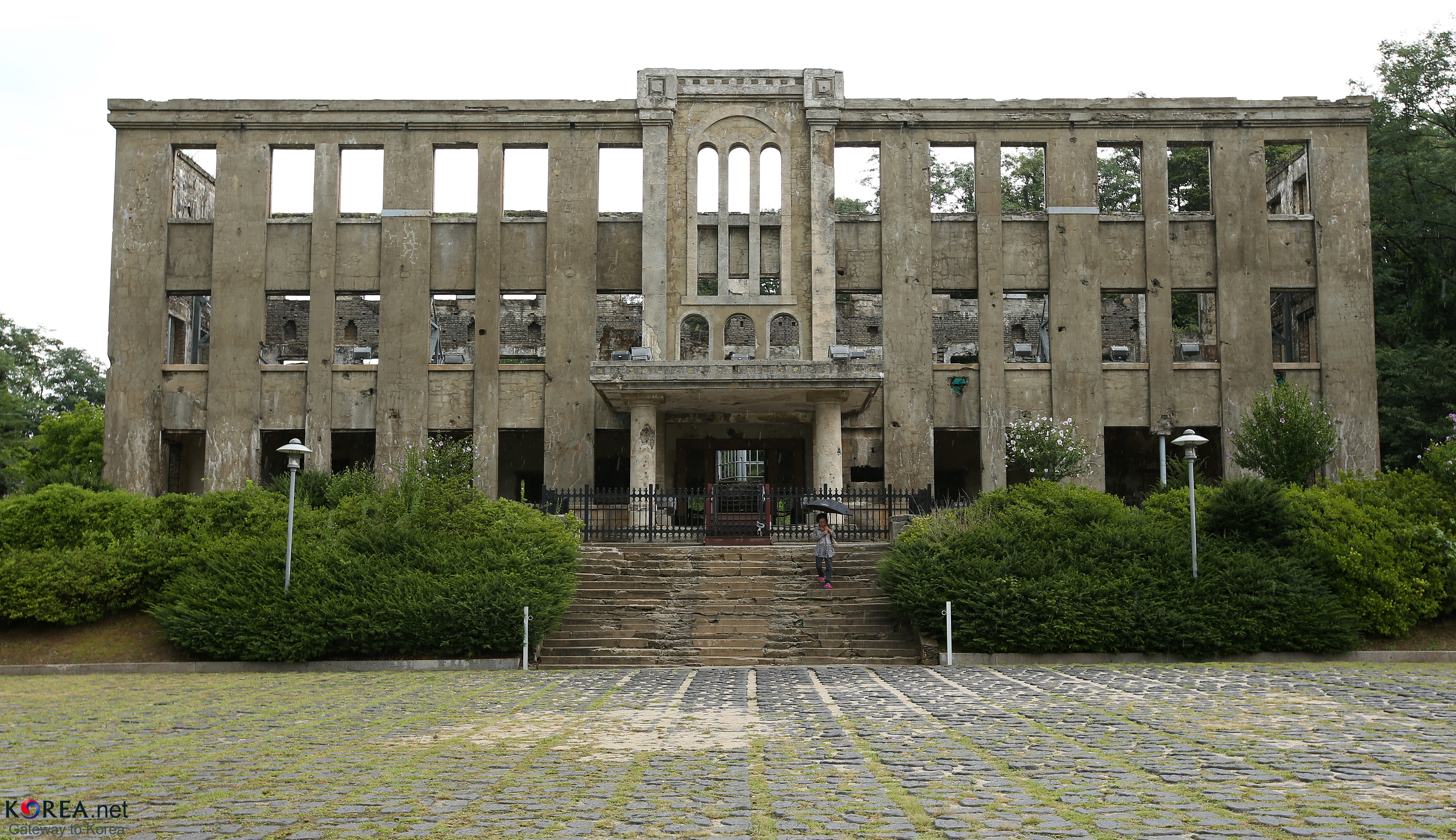
- Exterior of the Korean Workers' Party Headquarters, Cheorwon
- Interactive map of Korean Workers' Party Headquarters, Cheorwon
- 38°15′19″N 127°12′07″E
- Location: 3-5 Gwanjeon-ri, Cheorwon-eup, Cheorwon-gun, Gangwon-do, South Korea

History
- Built: 1946
- Built for: Workers' Party of North Korea

Site notes
- Area: 386.46 m^{2}
- Architectural styles: Socialist, Ancient Roman/Greek
- Owner: Cheorwon-gun Office
- Website: Korea Tourism Organization

The Korean Workers' Party Headquarters, Cheorwon (Korean: 철원 노동당사), also known as Nodongdangsa, is a three-story building formerly occupied by North Korea's ruling Workers' Party of Korea. It was initially situated in North Korea, but after the Korean War, the building came under South Korean control. It is now located in Cheorwon County, Gangwon Province.

The building was designated as a National Registered Cultural Property of the Republic of Korea No. 22 on 31 May 2002.

== History ==
Cheorwon was a county formerly under North Korean rule and site of the provincial government office of Kangwon Province prior to the Korean War. The origins of the building are unclear, as records indicate that it was built in early 1946, prior to the establishment of the Workers' Party of North Korea (predecessor to the current Workers' Party of Korea). Local residents were forced to contribute funds and may have been forcibly mobilised to complete the building, though other accounts state only 'zealous' party members participated in its construction to maintain secrecy. The headquarters commenced operations around 1946.

Its original intended purpose remains unconfirmed, but oral accounts indicate that its walls were soundproof, and that it was possibly used for assemblies and meetings. During the five years of communist rule, the headquarters served as a prison for detained activists, many who were tortured and killed. Its jurisdiction also extended to Gimhwa, Pyonggang, and Pocheon. It may have been used as a base of operations when planning the attack on South Korea owing to its close proximity to the border. As the Korean War settled into a stalemate, anti-communists were executed in the building prior to the North Korean withdrawal. Live ammunition and wire ropes were found in its bomb shelter after the war, in addition to human bones.

Cheorwon was the site of heavy fighting and completely destroyed during the war, with the headquarters being the only building in the county to survive. The area subsequently came under South Korean control and was located in the highly restricted civilian control zone of the Korean Demilitarized Zone, allowing the former headquarters to be saved from demolition. The restrictions in the civilian control zone were relaxed in the 1990s and the former headquarters is now a tourist attraction.

The building was designated as a National Registered Cultural Property of the Republic of Korea No. 22 on 31 May 2002. Peace prayers, concerts and the Unification Prayer Art Festival have been held at the site.

== Structure ==
The headquarters was constructed on a hill and employed a mixture of socialist realism and ancient Roman/Greek architecture to emphasise the ruling party's absolute authority. It was a three-storey reinforced steel structure, with bricks, lumber, and concrete used throughout the building, contributing to its sturdiness. The first floor consisted of two columns flanking the entrance hall, with a decorated arch situated above it. A wooden triangular roof may have once served as the ceiling.

Only the first floor and external façade remains intact today, with the upper levels having collapsed during the war. The external façade is riddled with bullet marks and tank caterpillar markings are still present at the entrance.

== Gallery ==
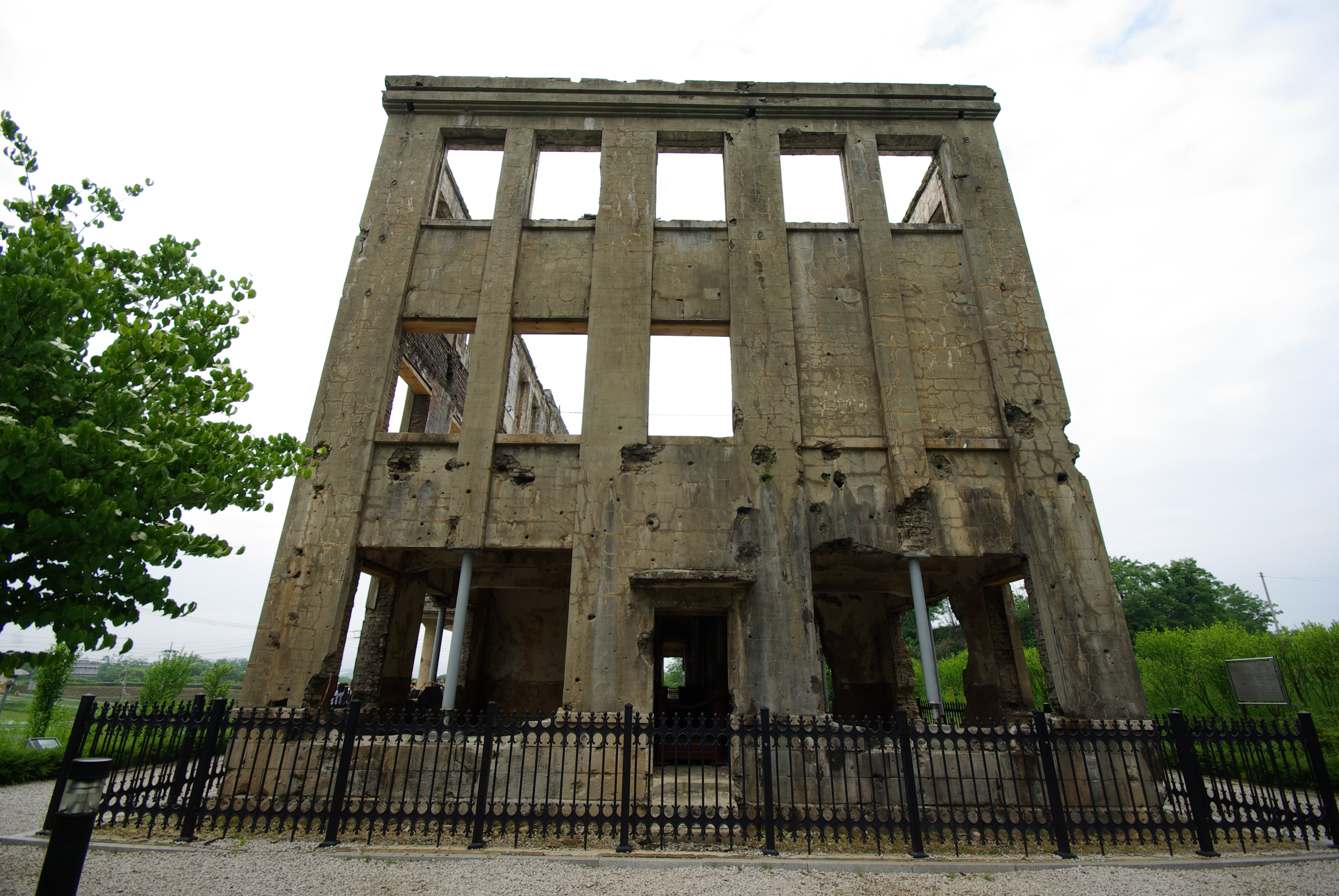

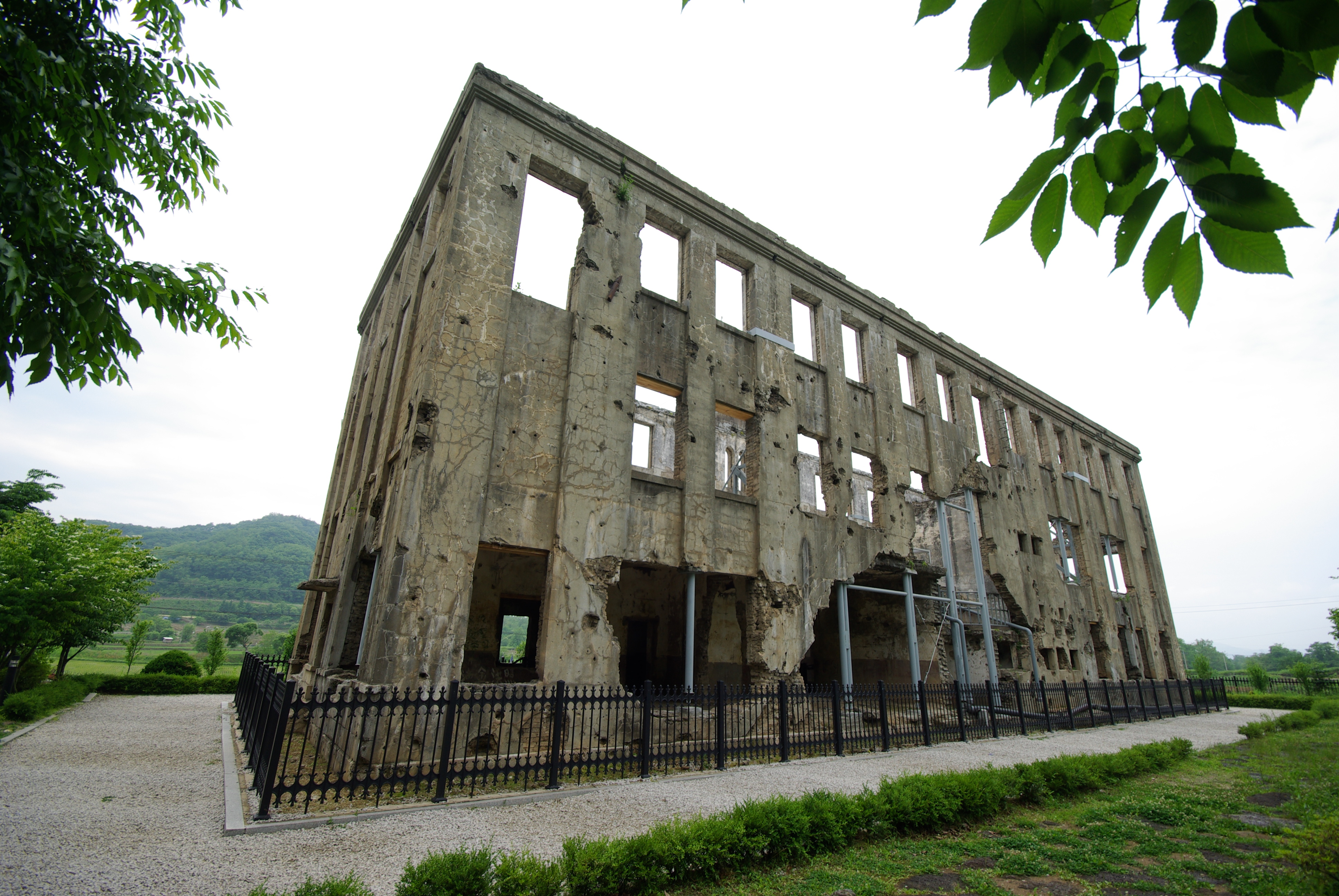

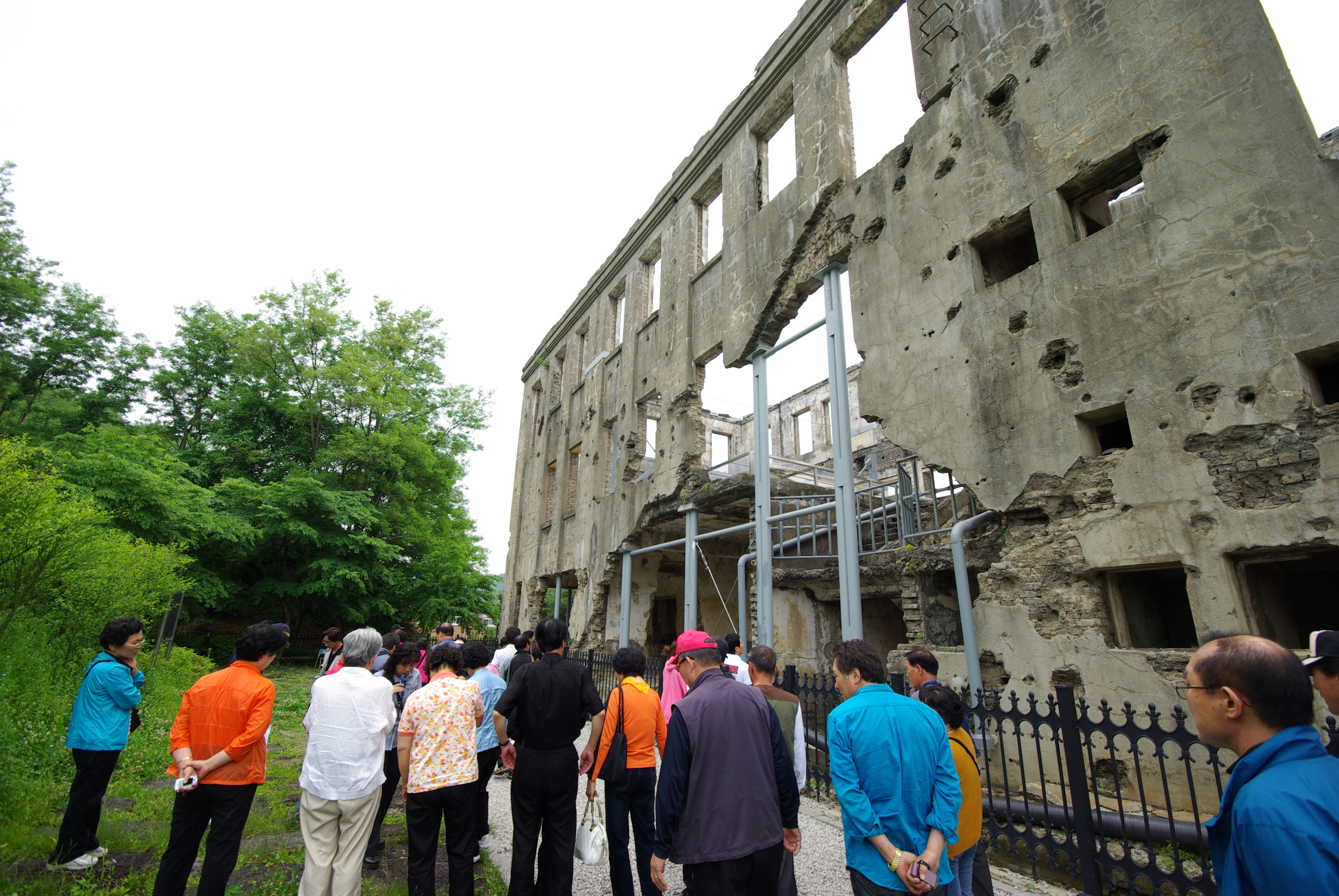
