= 7th Infantry Brigade (South Korea) =

- 제7보병여단
- Active: 7 February 1946 – Present
- Country: South Korea
- Branch: Republic of Korea Army
- Type: Infantry
- Size: Brigade
- Part of: 6th Infantry Division
- Garrison/HQ: Cheorwon County, Gangwon
- Engagements: Korean War

Commanders
- Current commander: Colonel ?

The 7th Infantry Brigade (Korean: 제7보병여단) is a military formation of the Republic of Korea Army's 6th Infantry Division.

== History ==
The 7th Infantry Regiment was the first unit of the United Nations Command to reach the Yalu River, and the only unit operating under Eighth Army command - as well as the only South Korean unit - to do so during the war. The 7th Infantry Regiment was originally activated on February 7, 1946, at Chongju and was first commanded by 2nd Lt. Min Ki Shik. The unit was initially assigned to the 4th Brigade in April 1949, which later became the 6th Brigade in November 1948, and was later reassigned to the 6th Division when it was activated in May 1949.

The unit participated in the Battle of Pusan Perimeter.

It also participated in the general 6th Division drive northwards during the UN offensive of 1950, until it reached Huichon, nearly sixteen miles north of Kujang-dong, on the night of October 23, 1950. Passing through Onjong during the night of the twenty-fourth, the regiment, turned north and advanced toward Chosan, fifty miles away on the Yalu River. A reinforced reconnaissance platoon from the regiment entered Chosan the next morning and found the North Koreans retreating across the Yalu into China over a narrow floating footbridge.

After the Battle of Onjong, the 6th division ordered the regiment to withdraw south. Before it could do so, however, it needed supplies, which were airdropped on the twenty-eighth. As it headed south the following morning, it ran into an enemy roadblock about twenty miles south of Kojang. Although it was able, with heavy air support, to fend off the enemy in daylight, the regiment was defeated and dispersed during the night. Eventually, about 875 officers and men of the 3,552 in the regiment escaped to Kunuri and rejoined the 6th Division.

In December 2020, 7th Infantry Regiment was promoted to a brigade.
