= Battle of Arrowhead Hill =

1952 battle of the Korean War

First Battle of Arrowhead Hill
- Part of Korean War
Date	6–10 October 1952
Location	Northwest of Cheorwon, Korea
Result	French victory

Belligerents
France	China

Units involved
(France) French Battalion	China 338th Regiment, 113th Division

Casualties and losses
48 dead 130 wounded	600 dead

Second Battle of Arrowhead Hill
- Part of Korean War
Date	29 June – 11 July 1953
Location	near Cheorwon-eup
Result	Inconclusive

Belligerents
South Korea	China

Units involved
(South Korea) 2nd Infantry Division	China ?

The Battle of Arrowhead Hill (Korean: 화살머리고지 전투) or the Battle of Arrowhead Ridge, was a battle in which UN Forces fought against the Chinese People's Volunteer Army (CPVA) during the Korean War.

== Background ==
Arrowhead Hill (Hill 281) was in the Iron Triangle, formed by Pyonggang at its peak and Gimhwa-eup and Cheorwon-eup at its base, a strategic transport route in the central region of the Korean peninsula.

== First battle (6–10 October 1952) ==
On 6 October 1952, CPVA dispatched a battalion or company size unit every night from October 6 to October 9 to attack Arrowhead Hill, but a French battalion defended the position using close-range combat tactics with artillery support.

At the same time, the ROK Army 9th Division was fighting CPVA on their right side at White Horse Hill.

As the French Battalion defended the hill until the end, they were able to subdue the CPVA and make a contribution to the defense of White Horse Hill located on their right side.

== Second Battle (29 June–11 July 1953) ==
In December 1952, the ROK Army 2nd Infantry Division took over the defence at Arrowhead Hill from the US Army 3rd Infantry Division.

In June and July 1953, there was a second battle that involved the ROK Army 2nd Infantry Division and CPVA.

From April 2019 to June 2020, Arrowhead Hill, which is in the Korean Demilitarized Zone was undergoing a remains recovery operation.

== See also ==
- Battle of White Horse Hill
