= 8th Division (North Korea) =

Korean People's Army military division

The 8th Infantry Division was a military formation of the Korean People's Army during the 20th Century.

It was formed early in July 1950 in the Chuncheon area from remnants of the 1st Border Constabulary Brigade and elements of the 2d Border Constabulary Brigade. Morale and effectiveness for the unit were believed low in late 1950 probably due to entering combat understrength and with ill-trained recruits. In 1950 the unit was composed of the 1st, 2nd, and 3rd Regiments as well as an artillery regiment.

It was part of the North Korean advance from Seoul to Taejon.

Of the heavy losses in artillery personnel and weapons which the inexperienced 8th Division suffered in succeeding engagements at the hands of UN artillery and aircraft, the damage inflicted by an air attack during the battle of Sindok-tong on August 9, was by far the most severe. In that attack, the division lost eight 76mm guns, four 122mm howitzers, and 12 trucks. A partial compensation occurred soon thereafter when the unit received six 76mm guns, four 122mm howitzers, four trucks, and about 50 replacements.

Fought in the Battle of Pusan Perimeter.

On the right flank of the Pusan Perimeter, in the mountainous region of the ROK II Corps, ROK 6th Division soldiers advanced slowly against the 8th Division. After four days of battle, the 8th Division was destroyed as a combat force, suffering about four thousand casualties. Enemy survivors fled in disarray north toward Yech'on. By September 21, the ROK 6th Division, meeting little opposition, was advancing northward toward Uihung.

While committed in the Seoul Sector along the Imjin River during the spring of 1951 as part of the I Corps, the division sustained considerable personnel casualties and lost a good portion of its scant artillery support including the entire regimental artillery of the 1st Rifle Regiment which was surrounded and completely annihilated on February 19 in the vicinity of Kwangju. Replacements for some of these losses were received prior to the May offensive during which the 8th Division spearheaded the I Corps assault on Seoul. At that time, thirteen 82mm mortars; six 12Omm mortars, twelve 45mm antitank guns, ten 76mm field guns, and four 122mm howitzers constituted the sum total of the artillery weapons at the disposal of the division. Colonel Lee To Bin was then the commander of the divisional artillery. Most of these weapons were concentrated at the regimental level.
