= Zhang Xuefeng =

Chinese education adviser

- 张雪峰
- Born: Zhang Zibiao (张子彪); 18 May 1984; Fuyu County, Heilongjiang, China
- Died: 24 March 2026 (aged 41); Suzhou, Jiangsu, China
- Education: Zhengzhou University (no degree)
- Occupations: Education consultant, internet personality
- Years active: 2010s–2026
- Organization(s): Suzhou Yantu Education Technology Co., Ltd.
- Known for: Graduate entrance exam tutoring, college major guidance

Chinese name
- Traditional Chinese: 張雪峰
- Simplified Chinese: 张雪峰
Transcriptions
Standard Mandarin
- Hanyu Pinyin: Zhāng Xuěfēng
- IPA: [ʈʂáŋɕɥèfə́ŋ]

Zhang Zibiao (张子彪; 18 May 1984 – 24 March 2026), professionally known as Zhang Xuefeng (张雪峰), was a Chinese education consultant and influencer. He became widely known in China for his advice on university major selection and postgraduate entrance exams, as well as for his outspoken and controversial commentary on education and employment.

Zhang rose to prominence in 2016 after a lecture video about postgraduate entrance examinations went viral online. He later built a large online following and a commercial education business focused on Gaokao (college entrance exam) consulting. His direct style and utilitarian approach to education attracted both popularity and criticism.

== Early life and education ==
Zhang was born in Fuyu County, Qiqihar, Heilongjiang, China. His ancestral home was in Linqing, Shandong. He was admitted to Zhengzhou University, where he studied water supply and drainage engineering, but did not complete his degree.

== Career ==
After leaving university, Zhang worked in the graduate examination training industry for nearly a decade before founding his own education companies in Suzhou and Beijing. He later received venture capital investment and expanded into educational consulting and online courses.

In 2016, Zhang gained nationwide attention after a lecture video summarizing postgraduate entrance exam institutions went viral online. He subsequently appeared in television and online variety programs.

By the 2020s, Zhang had become one of the most prominent figures in China's Gaokao consulting industry, with millions of followers across social media platforms and a business reportedly generating substantial revenue.

Zhang maintained accounts on major Chinese platforms including Douyin (with 26.719 million followers), Kuaishou (with 9.4 million followers), Weibo (with 8.1 million followers), Bilibili (with 4.1 million followers), and RedNote (with 1.662 million followers). In September 2025, his accounts were restricted from gaining followers following reported violations of platform rules during livestreams.

On 9 January 2023, he was elected as a deputy to the 14th Jiangsu Provincial People's Congress.

== Death ==
On 24 March 2026, Zhang died in Suzhou at the age of 41 due to sudden cardiac death.

== Works ==
- You Are Only One Book Away from Graduate Exam Success (你离考研成功，就差这本书, 2016)
- Direction Matters More Than Effort: Renowned Teacher Zhang Xuefeng's Guide to Passing the Postgraduate Entrance Examination (方向比努力更重要：名师张雪峰考研通关攻略, 2021)
- Choice Matters More Than Effort: Renowned Teacher Zhang Xuefeng's Step-by-Step Guide to Filling Out College Application Forms (选择比努力更重要：名师张雪峰手把手教你填报高考志愿, 2021; revised 2023)
- Winning at University: How You Should Spend Your College Years (决胜大学 —— 你的大学该如何度过, 2024)
- Choosing Majors from an Employment Perspective (从就业看专业, 2025)

== Personal life ==
Zhang's father worked in the railway sector, and his mother sold goods in a market after being laid off. His wife, Li Lijing (李丽婧), was a historian and university associate professor. They had one daughter.

== Controversies ==
Zhang Xuefeng was known for taking a highly pragmatic and economically oriented view toward higher education, frequently evaluating university majors based on their perceived employment prospects rather than disciplinary knowledge or academic merit. In his lectures, livestreams, and social media commentary, he often characterized certain fields – such as biology, chemistry, environmental science, materials science, civil engineering, journalism, humanities, liberal arts, and the arts – as offering limited career opportunities or lower practical value compared with economics, finance, accounting, business management, computer and IT fields, engineering, law, Chinese, or medical/health-related majors, and he actively cautioned students against choosing what he referred to as "unmarketable" majors.

His comments were often delivered in a provocative or emotionally charged manner that some observers described as discouraging, alarmist, or "scaremongering," and they frequently reinforced negative stereotypes about these disciplines by emphasizing their perceived weaknesses while giving less attention to their broader educational, scientific, or cultural contributions.

Critics, including education commentators and academics, argued that such rhetoric oversimplified the complexity and value of these fields and risked distorting students’ understanding of the labour market, disciplinary purpose, and intellectual diversity.

His comments on liberal arts education—such as describing it as leading primarily to service-sector jobs—generated widespread criticism as well as some support from students facing a competitive job market.

His criticism of journalism as a field of study also led to public debate and responses from academics.
