= 119th Motorized Infantry Brigade =

Brigade of the People's Liberation Army

The 119th Division was a military formation of the People's Volunteer Army (Chinese People's Volunteers (CPV) or Chinese Communist Forces (CCF)) during the Korean War with a standard strength of approximately 10,000 men. It was a component of the 40th Army, consisting of the 355th, 356th, and 357th Regiments.

== Current ==
The unit is now a maneuver element of the 79th Group Army in the Northern Theater Command Ground Force, as the 119th Light Combined Arms Brigade.
