= 15th Division (North Korea) =

The 15th Infantry Division (Korean: 조선인민군 륙군 제15사단) was a military formation of the Korean People's Army during the 20th Century.

== History ==
The division fought in the 1950 Korean War; it took part in the North Korean advance from Seoul to Taejon, and fought in the Battle of Pusan Perimeter. The 15th Division fought along the eastern coast, north of Pusan, eventually being killed.
