= 6th Infantry Division (South Korea) =

- 6th Division Insignia
- Founded: June 14, 1948
- Country: South Korea
- Branch: Republic of Korea Army
- Type: Infantry
- Role: Zone defense
- Part of: V Corps
- Garrison/HQ: Cheorwon County, Gangwon Province
- Nickname: Cheong Seong (Blue Star)
- Battle honours: Korean War

Commanders
- Current commander: Sim Jin Seon
- Notable commanders: Lt. Col. Lee Hyong Kun; Major General Kim Jong-oh; Major General Chang Do-yong

The 6th Infantry Division (Korean: 제6보병사단; Hanja: 第六步兵師團) is a military formation of the Republic of Korea Army.

== Structure ==
- Headquarters:
  - Headquarters Company
  - DMZ Patrol Company
  - Air Defense Company
  - Anti-Tank Company
  - Armor Battalion
  - Signal Battalion
  - Reconnaissance Battalion
  - Engineer Battalion
  - Support Battalion
  - Military Police Battalion
  - Medical Battalion
  - Chemical Battalion
- 2nd Infantry Brigade
- 7th Infantry Brigade
- 19th Infantry Brigade
- Artillery Brigade

== History ==
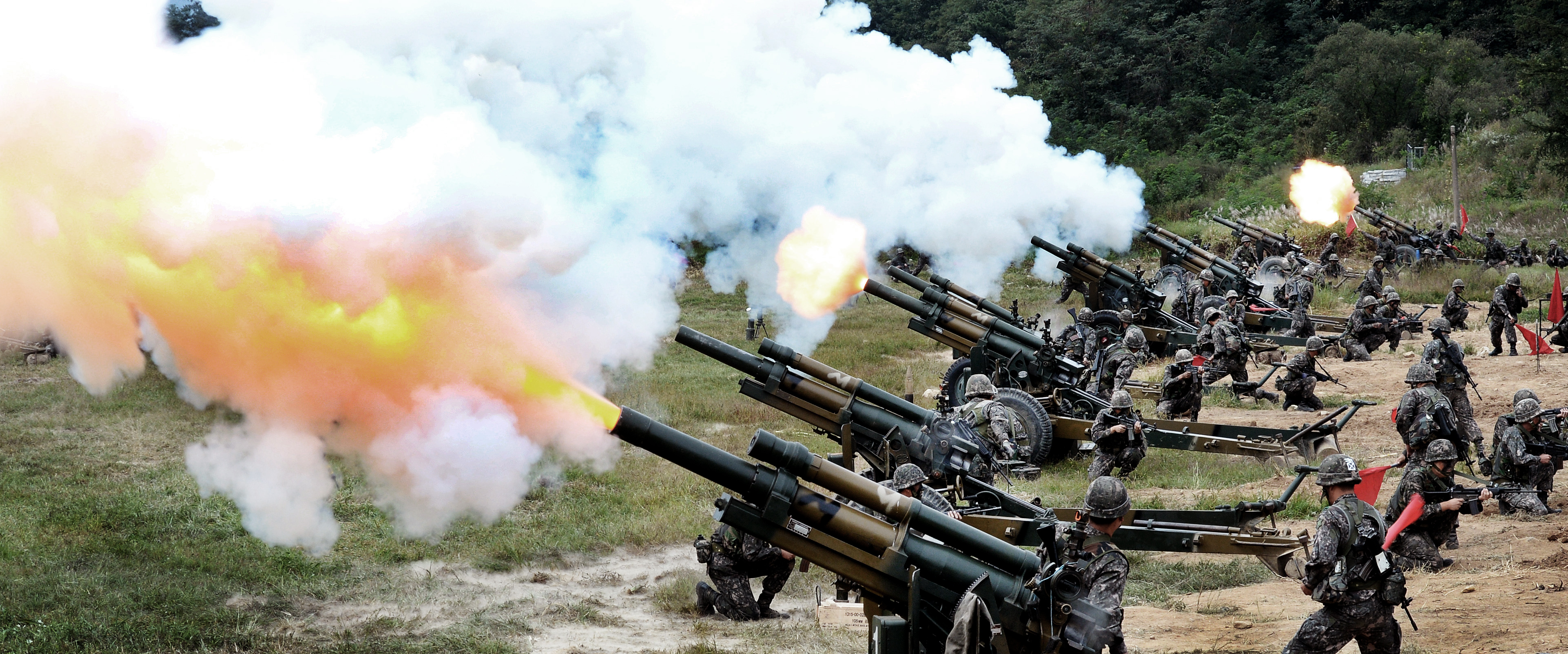
105mm howitzers of the 6th Infantry Division's Artillery Brigade

The Division initially consisted of the 2nd, 7th, and 19th Brigade.

=== Korean War ===
The 2nd Infantry Regiment was originally activated as the 2nd Regiment on February 28, 1946, at Taejon and was first commanded by Lieutenant colonel Lee Hyong Kun. The unit was initially assigned to the 1st Brigade in December 1947 and was later reassigned to the 6th Division when it was activated in May 1949. On June 25, 1950, the 6th Division took part in the Battle of Chuncheon during the North Korean attack.

The division became part of II Corps after the first fall of Seoul. It was part of the defensive line to slow the North Korean advance from Seoul to Taejon, and fought in the Battle of Pusan Perimeter.

The 6th Division, meeting little opposition and traveling fast up the Chongchon River valley, reached Huichon, nearly sixteen miles north of Kujang-dong, on the night of October 23, 1950. Passing through Onjong, twenty-six miles from Huich'on, during the night of the twenty-fourth, the 7th Regiment, 6th Division, turned north and advanced toward Chosan, fifty miles away on the Yalu River. A reinforced reconnaissance platoon from the 7th Regiment entered Chosan the next morning and found the North Koreans retreating across the Yalu into China over a narrow floating footbridge.

On October 25, in the ROK II Corps sector, the 3d Battalion, 2nd Regiment, 6th Division, started northwest from Onjong, about fifty miles from Yalu River, toward Pukchin. Eight miles west of Onjong the 3rd Battalion encountered what was thought to be a small force of North Koreans but was, in reality, a Communist Chinese forces (CCF) trap, in which CCF troops destroyed the 3rd Battalion as an organized force. On the evening of the next day the division ordered its 7th Regiment to withdraw south. Before it could do so, however, it needed supplies, which were airdropped on the twenty-eighth. As the 7th Regiment headed south the following morning, it ran into an enemy roadblock about twenty miles south of Kojang.

On 26 November 1950, a column of retreating South Korean soldiers of the ROKA 6th and 7th Divisions from Tokchon was attacked by a battalion of the Turkish Brigade who were the first to arrive at Wawon, after the Turks mistook the South Koreans for Chinese. 125 South Koreans were taken prisoner and many of them were slaughtered by the Turks. The event was wrongly reported in U.S. and European media as a Turkish victory over the Chinese and even after news leaked out about the truth to the Americans, no efforts were made by the media to retract the story.

After the Chinese intervention and attacks in November 1950, the U.S. 2nd Infantry Division, the Turkish Brigade, and the ROK 6th, 7th, and 8th Infantry Divisions were shattered units that would need extensive rest and refitting to recover combat effectiveness.

== See also ==
- Korean Demilitarized Zone

== Sources ==
- Appleman, Roy E. (2008). Disaster in Korea: The Chinese Confront MacArthur. Vol. 11 of Texas A & M University military history series: Texas A and M University (illustrated ed.). Texas A&M University Press. ISBN 978-1603441285.
- Leckie, Robert (1962). Conflict: The history of the Korean War 1950-1953. G. P. Putnam's Sons., New York. OCLC 964995.
