= Unsan (town) =

- Town

Korean transcription(s)
  - Hangul: 운산읍
  - Hanja: 雲山邑
  - Revised Romanization: Unsan-eup
  - McCune–Reischauer: Unsan-ŭp
- Country: North Korea
- Elevation: 22 m (72 ft)

Unsan-ŭp is the town in Unsan County, North Pyongan Province, North Korea. The former name Onjŏng-ri was reorganized to Unsan-eup in 1954.

== History ==
Onjŏng was a ri from 1949 to 1954.

In October 1950, Onjŏng was the location of the Battle of Onjong, the first contact between Chinese and United Nations Command forces in the Korean War.
