= Kim Jong-oh =

South Korean general (1921–1966)

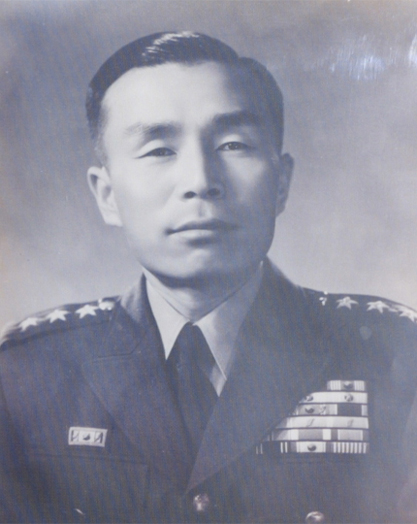
- Born: 22 May 1921; Chūseihoku-dō, Korea, Empire of Japan
- Died: 30 March 1966 (aged 44)
- Education: Chuo University
- Military career
- Allegiance: Empire of Japan; South Korea
- Branch: Imperial Japanese Army; Republic of Korea Army
- Service years: 1944-1945; 1946-1965
- Commands: 6th Infantry Division; 9th Infantry Division; I Corps
- Conflicts: Korean War; Great Naktong Offensive; Battle of White Horse Hill

Korean name
- Hangul: 김종오
- Hanja: 金鍾五
- RR: Gim Jongo
- MR: Kim Chongo

Kim Jong-oh (Korean: 김종오; 22 May 1921 – 30 March 1966) was a South Korean army colonel and general in the Korean War. He was active in the First Republic of Korea and Third Republic of Korea. He was the 10th president of the Republic of Korea Military Academy (1952–1954) and commander of the Republic of Korea 1st Army.

== Early life ==
Kim Jong-oh was born on 22 May 1921, in Chūseihoku-dō, Korea, Empire of Japan (now (North Chungcheong Province), South Korea). He went to Chuo University to study law in order to help Koreans.

== Military career ==
In 1944, while he was attending Chuo University, he was conscripted in the Imperial Japanese Army; he was later appointed second lieutenant. After the Empire of Japan surrendered, Kim came back to Korea. In 1946, he became second lieutenant (Service Number 10031) of the Korean Army. The next year, he became Lieutenant Colonel. In 1949, he became a Colonel. As commander of the 1st Brigade, he brought victory against the North Korean Army before the Korean War.

At the outbreak of the Korean War, he commanded the 6th Infantry Division. He delayed the advance of the North Korean Army for 5 days. In Eumseong County, Kim attacked the 48th Brigade of North Korea. His division killed thousands of men and captured 97 men. For this, Kim was promoted to Brigadier General. In September 1950, his division participated The Great Naktong Offensive. During the offensive, Kim was injured and appointed commander of the 9th Infantry Division, but he was returned to headquarters later. In 1952, he was appointed commander of the 9th Infantry Division and participated in the Battle of White Horse Hill. For 10 days, his division defended the White Horse Hill against three Chinese divisions under the 35th Army Corps of China. His division finally made the Chinese Army retreat.

After the Korean Armistice, Kim was appointed commander of I Corps. Later he became Chairman of the Joint Chiefs of Staff, and Chief of Staff. In 1962, he became Daejang, and he retired from the army in 1965. On March 30, 1966, Kim died of lung cancer. His funeral was conducted in the army headquarters with a Buddhist ritual.

== Bibliography ==
- 佐々木春隆 (1979). 朝鮮戦争/韓国篇 上・中・下巻. 原書房.
- 白善燁 (2000). 若き将軍の朝鮮戦争. 草思社. ISBN 4-79-420974-6.
- 韓国国防軍史研究所 編著 (2001). 韓国戦争 第2巻. Translated by 翻訳・編集委員会. かや書房. ISBN 4-90-612445-3.
- 韓国国防軍史研究所 編著 (2004). 韓国戦争 第4巻. Translated by 翻訳・編集委員会. かや書房. ISBN 4-90-612458-5.
- 韓国国防軍史研究所 編著 (2010). 韓国戦争 第6巻. Translated by 翻訳・編集委員会. かや書房. ISBN 978-4-90-612469-5.
