= Cheorwon County =

Coordinates: 38°12′33″N 127°13′03″E

Cheorwon
- County
- Panoramic view of Galmal-eup

- Flag Emblem of Cheorwon

- Location in South Korea
- Country: South Korea
- State: Gangwon
- Administrative divisions: 4 eup, 3 myeon

Area
  - Total: 899.82 km^{2} (347.42 sq mi)

Population (September 2024)
  - Total: 40,646
  - Density: 60.05/km^{2} (155.5/sq mi)

Korean name
- Hangul: 철원군
- Hanja: 鐵原郡
- RR: Cheorwon-gun
- MR: Ch'ŏrwŏn-gun

Cheorwon County (Korean: 철원군; Korean pronunciation: [tɕʰʌɾwʌnɡun]), also spelled Chorwon, is a county in the state of Gangwon, South Korea. It is located right next to the North Korean border.

== History ==
- Goguryeo – first named Moeuldongbi.
- Silla dynasty – name changed to Cheolseong.
  - During the Later Three Kingdoms period of Korea, Gung Ye determined it capital of Taebong.
- Goryeo dynasty
  - In 918, during the rule of King Taejo of Goryeo, its name was changed to Cheorwon and then renamed as Dongju.
- Joseon dynasty
  - King Taejong changed its name into 'Dohobu'.
  - In 26th year of King Sejong's reign (1434), it was transferred from Gyeonggi-do to Gangwon.
  - On May 26 of the King Gojong, altered to Chuncheon-bu.

=== Korean War ===
Following the Division of Korea in 1945, all of Cheorwon County was part of North Korea.

During the Korean War the region changed hands several times during the UN invasion of North Korea and the Chinese invasion of South Korea, by 1951 the frontlines had stabilized, cutting across Cheorwon County and the area became part of the Iron Triangle. The Battle of Arrowhead Hill took place north of Cheorwon town from 6 to 10 October 1952 and the Battle of White Horse Hill took place north of Cheorwon town from 6 to 15 October 1952. The Battle of Triangle Hill took place north of Gimhwa-eup from 14 October to 25 November 1952.

Following the signing of the Korean Armistice Agreement, the Korean Demilitarized Zone (DMZ) divided Cheorwon County in two, creating Cheorwon County in South Korea and Chorwon County in North Korea, respectively.

Several Korean War sites in Cheorwon County are now tourist destinations including the former Woljeong-ri station, the former Korean Workers’ Party Office, the Iron Triangle Tourist Office, the Second Incursion Tunnel and the Cheorwon Peace Observatory.

=== Civilian Control Line (CCL) ===
The Civilian Control Line is an additional buffer zone to the DMZ. The distance between the DMZ and CCL in South Korea ranges from 5 to 20 km (3.1 to 12.4 mi). The purpose is to limit and control the entrance of civilians into areas to protect and maintain the security of military facilities and operations near the DMZ.

== Tourism ==
For South Korea, tourism has been important since the 1962 Five Year Development Plan. This designated a key economic development sector and a 'patriotic industry' (Hunter, 153). Historically nationalistic or patriotic perspectives have driven for the development of tourism in South Korea. Well organized tours and defined monuments and sites ensure these bordering areas are populated with visitors that participate in the symbolic landscape promoted by the South Korean government (Hunter, 153).

Described as "a scene of bloody battles" (n.d) and an area of tense border activity, the front-line county of Cheorwon presents a paradox. This historical county is infrequently visited by Western tourists. To understand the historical context of the Korean War, Cheorwon County offers significant insight into the conflict between North and South Korea.

=== The Second Tunnel ===
The tunnel was detected by South Korean guards who heard explosions underground during their shift. After excavation on March 19, 1975, the second infiltration tunnel was discovered. The tunnel was intended for a sudden raid by the North Korean Army into South Korea. The second tunnel is composed of a firm granitic layer, is 3.5 km (2.2 mi) in length, and varies in depth from 50–160 m (160–520 ft).

=== Cheorwon Peace Observatory ===
"Cheorwon Peace Observatory" (n.d) is located at Junggang-ri, Dongsong-eup, South Korea. The Observatory is three stories high with a basement and was opened in November 2007. The observatory's first floor is the exhibition hall and the second floor is an observatory. Tourists on the second floor can observe the surrounding ecosystem, fortress of Gung-Ye Cast town, Pyeonggang tableland, and Seonjeon town of North Korea in the DMZ.

=== Memorial Tower of the Baekma Goji (White Horse) Battle ===
During ten days of battle, the hill would change hands 24 times after repeated attacks and counterattacks for its possession. The original shape of the hill was transformed from more than 300,000 artillery shells and bombs. The destroyed ridge looked like a white horse lying down, so it was named Baekma Goji, meaning white horse hill.

=== Seungni (Victory Observatory) ===
The Seungni Observatory is located on Cheonbulsan Mountain, near the midpoint of the DMZ. From the observatory tourists can view North Korean Army soldiers, and the actual sites of the national division such as Geumgansan Railroad, Gwangasm Plain, and Achim-ri town.

== Symbols ==
- County tree: Korean Nut Pine
- County flower: Royal Azalea
- County bird: Crane

== Location ==
Cheorwon plays an important role in providing passage from Seoul to Wonsan and Kumgangsan.

Since the expansion of the 43 National Road which connects Cheorwon and Seoul, the ease of transportation has been improved greatly.

== Climate ==
Cheorwon has a monsoon-influenced humid continental climate (Köppen: Dwa).

Climate data for Cheorwon (1991–2020 normals, extremes 1988–present)
| Month | Jan | Feb | Mar | Apr | May | Jun | Jul | Aug | Sep | Oct | Nov | Dec | Year |
|---|---|---|---|---|---|---|---|---|---|---|---|---|---|
| Record high °C (°F) | 13.1 (55.6) | 17.5 (63.5) | 22.4 (72.3) | 29.8 (85.6) | 32.5 (90.5) | 34.0 (93.2) | 36.0 (96.8) | 38.4 (101.1) | 33.7 (92.7) | 29.0 (84.2) | 24.0 (75.2) | 14.5 (58.1) | 38.4 (101.1) |
| Mean daily maximum °C (°F) | 0.7 (33.3) | 4.1 (39.4) | 10.2 (50.4) | 17.5 (63.5) | 22.9 (73.2) | 26.7 (80.1) | 28.1 (82.6) | 28.9 (84.0) | 25.0 (77.0) | 19.1 (66.4) | 10.5 (50.9) | 2.7 (36.9) | 16.4 (61.5) |
| Daily mean °C (°F) | −5.7 (21.7) | −2.3 (27.9) | 3.7 (38.7) | 10.5 (50.9) | 16.6 (61.9) | 21.1 (70.0) | 23.8 (74.8) | 24.0 (75.2) | 18.9 (66.0) | 11.8 (53.2) | 4.3 (39.7) | −3.2 (26.2) | 10.3 (50.5) |
| Mean daily minimum °C (°F) | −11.8 (10.8) | −8.6 (16.5) | −2.6 (27.3) | 3.4 (38.1) | 10.4 (50.7) | 16.1 (61.0) | 20.2 (68.4) | 20.1 (68.2) | 13.6 (56.5) | 5.5 (41.9) | −1.2 (29.8) | −8.6 (16.5) | 4.7 (40.5) |
| Record low °C (°F) | −29.2 (−20.6) | −24.6 (−12.3) | −13.4 (7.9) | −8.2 (17.2) | 0.9 (33.6) | 6.1 (43.0) | 11.3 (52.3) | 8.8 (47.8) | 3.5 (38.3) | −6.3 (20.7) | −13.8 (7.2) | −22.2 (−8.0) | −29.2 (−20.6) |
| Average precipitation mm (inches) | 18.2 (0.72) | 26.3 (1.04) | 30.8 (1.21) | 69.0 (2.72) | 102.4 (4.03) | 119.0 (4.69) | 400.0 (15.75) | 347.4 (13.68) | 121.2 (4.77) | 49.9 (1.96) | 48.1 (1.89) | 22.1 (0.87) | 1,354.4 (53.32) |
| Average precipitation days (≥ 0.1 mm) | 6.3 | 6.0 | 7.3 | 8.1 | 9.1 | 10.9 | 16.6 | 14.3 | 8.4 | 6.6 | 8.1 | 7.5 | 109.2 |
| Average snowy days | 9.2 | 6.2 | 4.5 | 0.3 | 0.0 | 0.0 | 0.0 | 0.0 | 0.0 | 0.0 | 2.3 | 7.3 | 29.7 |
| Average relative humidity (%) | 67.1 | 63.1 | 60.5 | 58.3 | 64.4 | 71.4 | 81.3 | 81.4 | 76.9 | 72.9 | 71.6 | 70.0 | 69.9 |
| Mean monthly sunshine hours | 173.3 | 176.0 | 196.5 | 203.7 | 224.5 | 198.7 | 141.9 | 170.0 | 187.0 | 200.6 | 152.3 | 159.0 | 2,183.5 |
| Percentage possible sunshine | 52.9 | 54.7 | 48.2 | 49.5 | 47.1 | 40.2 | 28.5 | 39.1 | 47.8 | 53.4 | 48.6 | 50.4 | 46.0 |
Source: Korea Meteorological Administration (percent sunshine and snowy days 1981–2010)

== Sister cities ==
- Gangnam-gu, Seoul
- Seogwipo, Jeju-do
- Sinan-gun, South Jeolla Province
- Jeongseon-gun, Gangwon State

== See also ==
- Administrative divisions of South Korea
- Chorwon County, North Korea
- Geography of South Korea
