= Battle of Pusan Perimeter logistics =

Part of Korean War

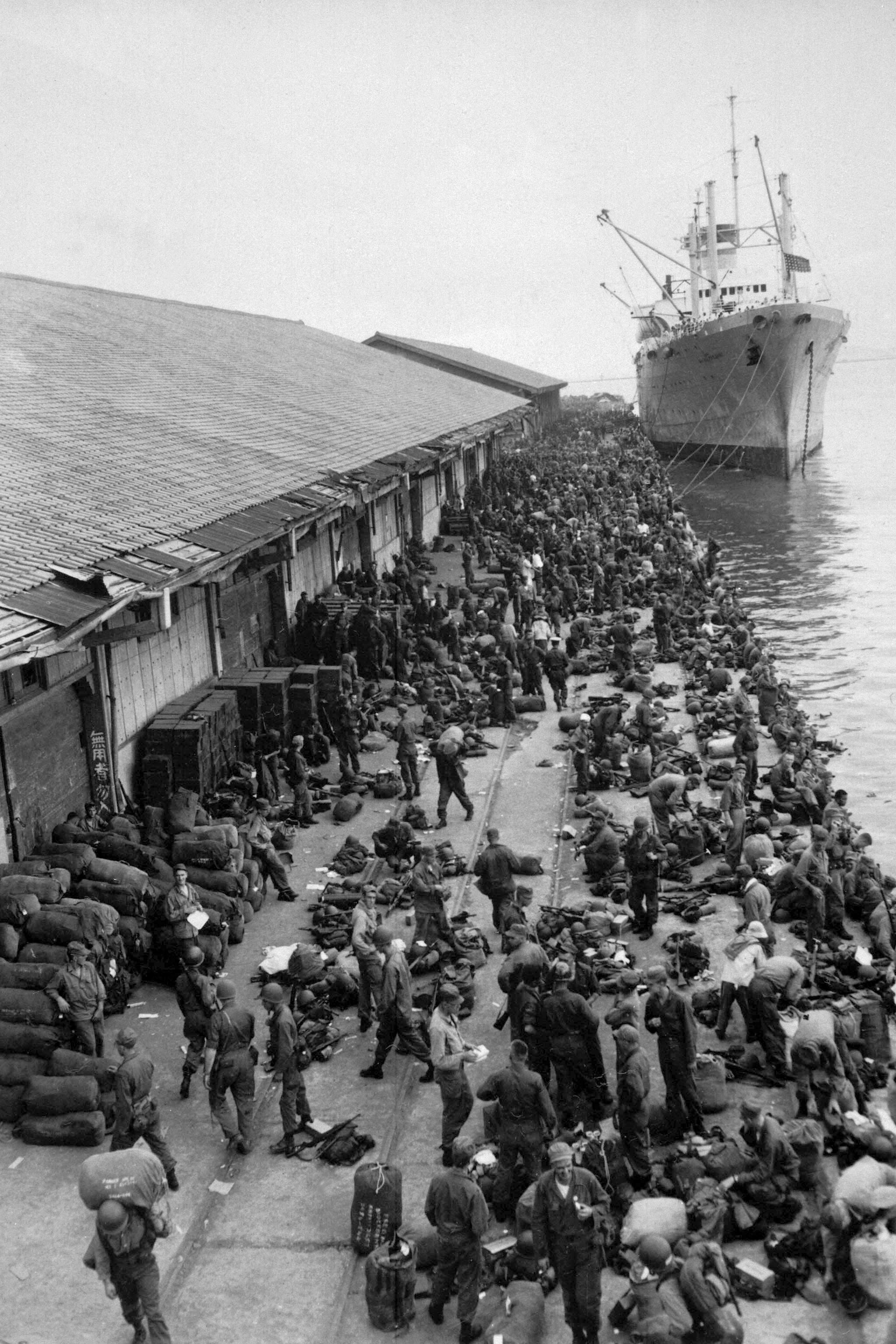
UN troops unload in Korea

Logistics in the Battle of Pusan Perimeter (August 4 – September 15, 1950) during the Korean War played a decisive role in the battle. Efficient logistics, the management of personnel and materiel, supported United Nations (UN) supply lines while the North Koreans' routes of supply were steadily reduced and cut off. UN logistics improved throughout the Battle of Inchon and the defeat of the North Korean army at Busan.

UN forces, consisting mostly of troops from the Republic of Korea (ROK), the United States (US), and United Kingdom (UK), enjoyed overwhelming air and sea superiority during the battle. The UN efficiently procured and transported supplies from a large stockpile of materiel in nearby Japan.

In contrast, North Korean logistics were hampered by UN interdiction campaigns which slowed the flow of supplies from North Korea to the battle. Though supported logistically by the Soviet Union and China during the battle, North Koreans often had difficulties getting their supplies from depots to the front lines, leaving North Korean troops unsupported during several crucial engagements.

== Background ==
=== Outbreak of war ===
On the night of June 25, 1950, ten divisions of North Korea's Korean People's Army (KPA) launched a full-scale invasion on the nation's neighbor to the south, the Republic of Korea. The force of 89,000 men moved in six columns, catching the Republic of Korea Army by surprise, resulting in a complete rout. The smaller South Korean army suffered from widespread lack of organization and equipment, and it was unprepared for war. Numerically superior, North Korean forces destroyed isolated resistance from the 38,000 South Korean soldiers on the front before it began moving steadily south. Most of South Korea's forces retreated in the face of the invasion. By June 28, the North Koreans had captured South Korea's capital of Seoul, forcing the government and its shattered army to retreat further south.

To prevent South Korea's complete collapse, the United Nations Security Council voted to send military forces. The United States' Seventh Fleet dispatched Task Force 77, led by the fleet carrier USS Valley Forge; the British Far East Fleet also dispatched several ships, including HMS Triumph, to provide air and naval support. Although the navies blockaded North Korea and launched aircraft to delay the North Korean forces, these efforts alone did not stop the North Korean Army juggernaut on its southern advance. To supplement the air support, US President Harry S. Truman ordered ground troops into the country. Although the Eighth United States Army's US 24th Infantry Division was in Japan and was available to respond to the situation, cuts in military spending after the end of World War II meant that the overall strength of the US military in the Far East was limited and the division itself was understrength and operating outmoded equipment. Nevertheless, the division was ordered into Korea.

The 24th Infantry Division was the first US unit sent into Korea with the mission to take the initial "shock" of North Korean advances alongside the South Korean army, delaying much larger North Korean units to buy time to allow UN reinforcements to arrive. The division was consequently alone for several weeks as it attempted to delay the North Koreans while the 7th Infantry Division, 25th Infantry Division, 1st Cavalry Division, and other Eighth Army supporting units moved into position. On July 5, during the first battle between American and North Korean forces, advance elements of the 24th Infantry Division were badly defeated at Osan. Over the course of the following month, the 24th Infantry Division was repeatedly defeated and forced south by the stronger and more heavily equipped North Koreans. During this time heavy fighting occurred around Chochiwon, Chonan, and Pyongtaek before the 24th Infantry Division made a final stand at Taejon. Although they were almost completely destroyed in the fighting, the US troops were able to delay North Korean advance until July 20, by which time the Pusan Perimeter had been established. With UN units arriving every day, the Eighth Army was able to build up a force of combat troops that were roughly equal to North Korean forces attacking the region.

=== North Korean advance ===
With Taejon captured, North Korean forces began the effort of surrounding the Pusan Perimeter from all sides in an attempt to envelop it. The North Korean 4th Infantry Division and the North Korean 6th Infantry Division advanced south in a wide coordinated maneuver that was aimed at the UN's left flank. Advancing on UN positions, they repeatedly forced US and South Korean forces to withdraw. Although they were steadily pushed back, South Korean forces increased their resistance further south in an effort to delay North Korean units as much as possible. North and South Korean units sparred for control of several cities, inflicting heavy casualties on one another. The Republic of Korea Army forces defended Yongdok fiercely before being forced back. They also performed well in the Battle of Andong, where they were successful in repelling North Korean advances.

In the west, US forces were pushed back repeatedly before finally halting the North Korean advance. Forces from the 3rd Battalion, 29th Infantry Regiment, newly arrived in the country, were wiped out at Hadong in a coordinated ambush by North Korean forces on July 27, leaving open a pass to the Busan area. Soon after, Chinju to the west was taken, pushing the 19th Infantry Regiment back and leaving routes to the Pusan open for North Korean forces. US units were subsequently able to defeat and push back the North Koreans on the flank in the Battle of the Notch on August 2. Suffering mounting losses, the North Korean force on the west flank withdrew for several days to re-equip and receive reinforcements. This granted both sides several days of reprieve to prepare for the attack on the Pusan Perimeter.

== United Nations logistics ==
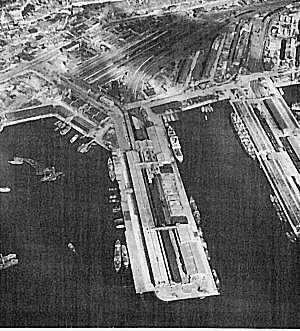
Pusan harbor, where the majority of UN supplies were processed, in 1950.

On July 1, the US Far East Command directed the Eighth United States Army to assume responsibility for all logistical support of the United Nations Command (UNC) in Korea. This included the ROK Army, US Army and British Army forces operating in Korea. It also included support for the ships of Australia, Canada, New Zealand and the Netherlands which were also contributing to the effort. When the Eighth Army became operational in Korea, this logistical function was assumed by Eighth Army Rear which remained behind in Yokohama, Japan. This dual role of the Eighth Army—that of combat in Korea and of logistical support for all troops fighting there—led to the designation of that part of the army in Korea as Eighth United States Army in Korea. This situation existed until August 25. On that date the Far East Command activated the Japan Logistical Command with Major General Walter L. Weible in command. It took over the logistical duties previously held by Eighth Army Rear. It also assumed responsibility of the movement of refugees and prisoners of war.

The supplies needed to support the American and South Korean armies came through the United States and Japan. Whatever could be obtained from stocks in Japan or procured from Japanese manufacturers was obtained there. In early July 1950, Japanese manufacturers began making antitank mines and on July 18 a shipment of 3,000 of them arrived by boat at Busan. The equipment and ordnance supplies that was available to the United States forces in Korea in the first months of the war was largely due to the "roll-up" plan of the Far East Command which had been in effect for some time before the outbreak of hostilities. It called for the reclamation of ordnance items from World War II in the US Pacific island outposts and their repair or reconstruction in Japan. This plan had been conceived and started in 1948 by Brigadier General Urban Niblo, the senior Ordnance Officer of the Far East Command. During July and August 1950 an average of 4,000 automotive vehicles cleared through the ordnance repair shops each month; in the year after the outbreak of the Korean War more than 46,000 automotive vehicles were repaired or rebuilt in Japan.

=== Challenges ===
The re-equipping of the ROK Army presented the UN forces with a large logistical problem in July. To meet part of the requirements, the US command contracted Japanese manufacturers in August to produce 68,000 vehicles for the ROK Army, mostly cargo and dump trucks, with first deliveries to be made in September. However, the largest challenge faced by UN forces was a shortage of ammunition. At the outbreak of the war and up until the Pusan Perimeter engagements, the UNC's forces had to rely mainly upon the stock of World War II surplus ammunition. Much of this malfunctioned or no longer worked, indeed in some cases up to 60 percent did not work, and as a result ammunition, particularly for crew-served weapons, was frequently in short supply. From the outset, high-explosive anti-tank (HEAT) ammunition was particularly scarce, but this changed as US and Japanese manufacturers increased production to meet wartime needs, as a part of the Far East Command's "Operation Rebuild". By August 1950 this operation had assumed gigantic proportions and before the end of 1950 it had expanded to employ 19,908 people in eight Japanese shops. Through these efforts, UNC logistics situations improved over time, but nevertheless ammunition remained in short supply for much of the war.

Another issue that strained the UN logistics system was the lack of a previously drafted resupply plan. Consumption rates differed among the various units and as a result of a lack of coordination, some UN units faced supply shortages when other units would request more material than they actually needed. In order to rectify this situation UN logisticians were forced to hastily create a plan as the need arose.

The lack of armor available was also a serious issue of the UNC. In order to meet the demand, a variety of armored old platforms were hastily rebuilt and modified for movement into the Pusan Perimeter. M4A3 Sherman medium tanks (preferably the most advanced model, the M4A3E8 (76)W HVSS Sherman) from World War II were pulled from stocks and rebuilt for use in Korea. M15A1 Half-tracks were also rebuilt and modified for use in Korea. During early engagements, the M24 Chaffee light tank was the main armored vehicle used by the Americans because it was most readily available and most combat-ready; nevertheless, it performed poorly against heavier North Korean armor. All of these weapons had been used in World War II and were considered in poor condition. The appearance of the North Korean T-34 tanks forced the US to move large numbers of heavier, more powerful tanks into the battle. During August, six tank battalions, with around 69 tanks each, arrived at Pusan. By the end of the month there were more than 500 UN tanks assembled there. Most were M4A3E8 Shermans, and the bigger M26 Pershing heavy tanks, although a limited number of the new M46 Patton tanks were also moved into the perimeter.

On July 9, the US 2nd Infantry Division, with several armor and antiaircraft artillery units, was ordered to proceed to the Far East. The next day, MacArthur requested that the 2nd Division be brought to full war strength, if possible, without delaying its departure. He also reiterated his need of the units required to bring the four infantry divisions already in the Far East to full war strength. He detailed these as four heavy tank battalions, 12 heavy tank companies, 11 infantry battalions, 11 field artillery battalions, and four antiaircraft automatic weapons battalions per division. By August 7, the US 9th Infantry Regiment was operational in Korea, and had been sent to the Naktong Bulge area. However it would be the end of the month before the rest of the 2nd Infantry Division arrived in Korea.

After World War II, the Army developed the Mobile Army Surgical Hospital (MASH) concept from experiences in the European Theater. The US Army sought a highly mobile hospital unit which could be as close to the fighting as possible to increase the survival rate of casualties. These 60-bed, 124-man units would act as mobile hospitals for the treatment of the wounded. By the beginning of the hostilities in Korea, all MASH units were undermanned and the difficult terrain in Korea prevented easy transport, making it very difficult for the MASH units to operate in the Pusan Perimeter battle. The 8055th MASH was the first such unit to arrive in Korea, being assigned to the 24th Infantry Division on July 9. Two more hospitals, the 8063rd and 8067th, would join the UN forces in the Pusan Perimeter fighting. The MASH units were routinely overwhelmed with patients due to shortages of transport, often receiving between 150 and 200 per day, although sometimes the number was high as 400. The units operated on men that were too critical to be transported. Those who could be moved or could not be treated in the MASH were taken by air or sea to US Army hospitals in Japan depending on the severity of their injuries.

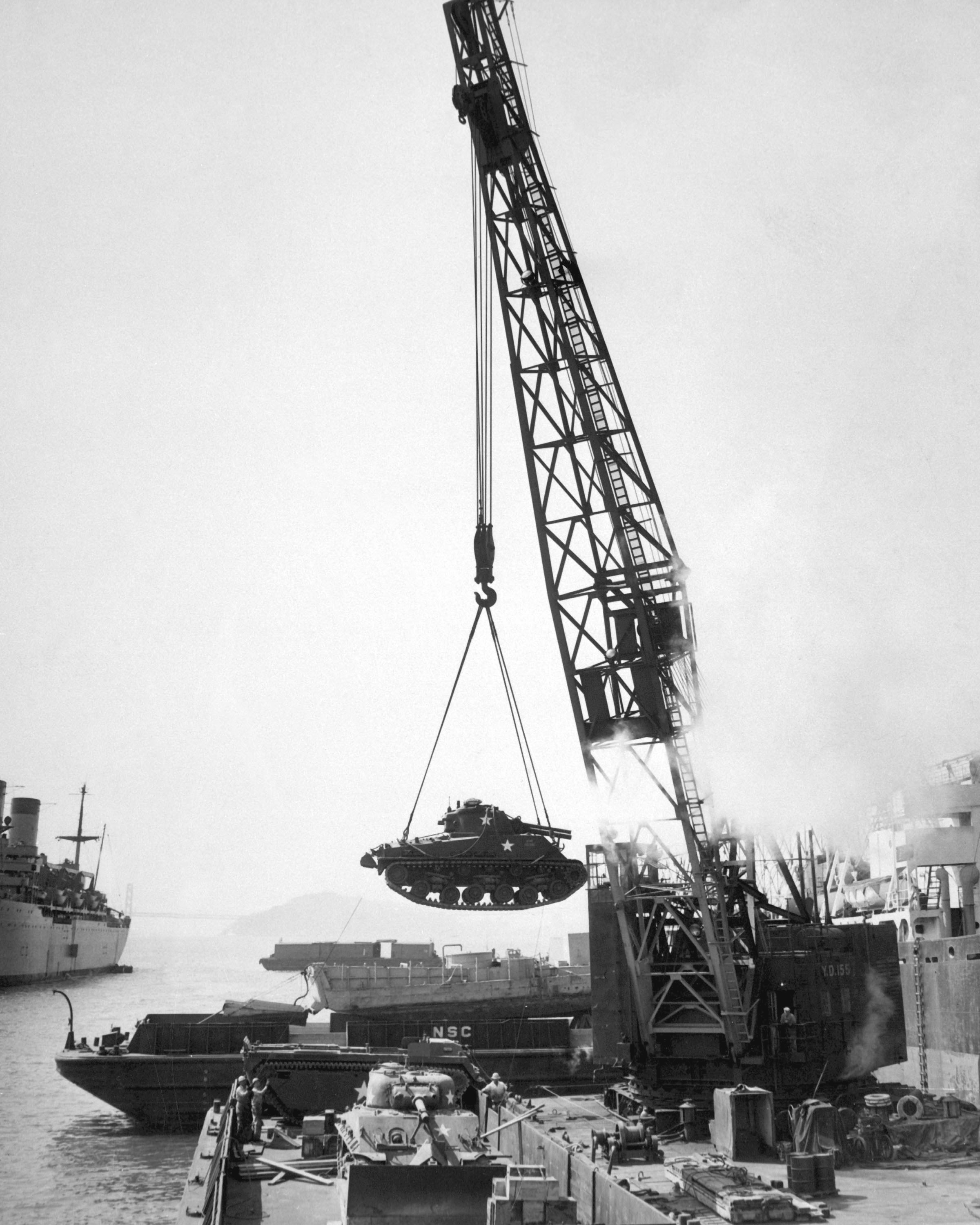
A US M4 Sherman tank being loaded into a boat at a California port, for movement to Pusan, 1950.

Sustenance for the UN troops in Korea was among the other logistical challenges confronting the UN in the early days of the war. There were no C rations in Korea and only a small reserve in Japan at the outbreak of the war. The Quartermaster General of the United States Army immediately began moving all available C rations and 5-in-1 B rations from the United States to the Far East. Field rations at first were largely the less nutritious and palatable World War II K rations. The UN had to rely on much of the US stock of World War II-era material for much of this phase of the war. Provisioning of the ROK troops was an equally important and difficult problem. The regular issue ration to ROK troops was rice or barley and fish. It consisted of about 29 ounces (820 g) of rice or barley, one half pound of biscuit, and one half pound of canned fish with spices. Often the cooked rice, made into balls and wrapped in cabbage leaves, was sour when it reached the combat troops on the line, and frequently it did not arrive at all. Occasionally, local purchase of foods on a basis of 200 Won (US$0.05) per day per man supplemented the issued ration. An improved ROK ration consisting of three menus, one for each daily meal, was ready in September 1950. It provided 3,210 calories, weighed 2.3 pounds (1.0 kg), and consisted of rice starch, biscuits, rice cake, peas, kelp, fish, chewing gum, and condiments, and was packed in a waterproofed bag. With slight changes, this ration was found acceptable to the ROK troops and quickly put into production. It became the standard ration for them during the first year of the war.

=== Air resupply ===
An emergency airlift of critically needed items began almost immediately from the United States to the Far East. The Military Air Transport Service (MATS), Pacific Division, expanded rapidly after the outbreak of the war. The Pacific airlift was further expanded by the charter of civil airlines planes. The Canadian Government lent the United Nations a Royal Canadian Air Force squadron of six transports, while the Belgian Government added several DC-4s to the effort. Altogether, the fleet of about 60 four-engine transport planes operating across the Pacific before June 25, 1950, was quickly expanded to approximately 250. In addition to these, there were MATS C-74 Globemaster and C-97 Stratofreighter planes operating between the United States and Hawaii.

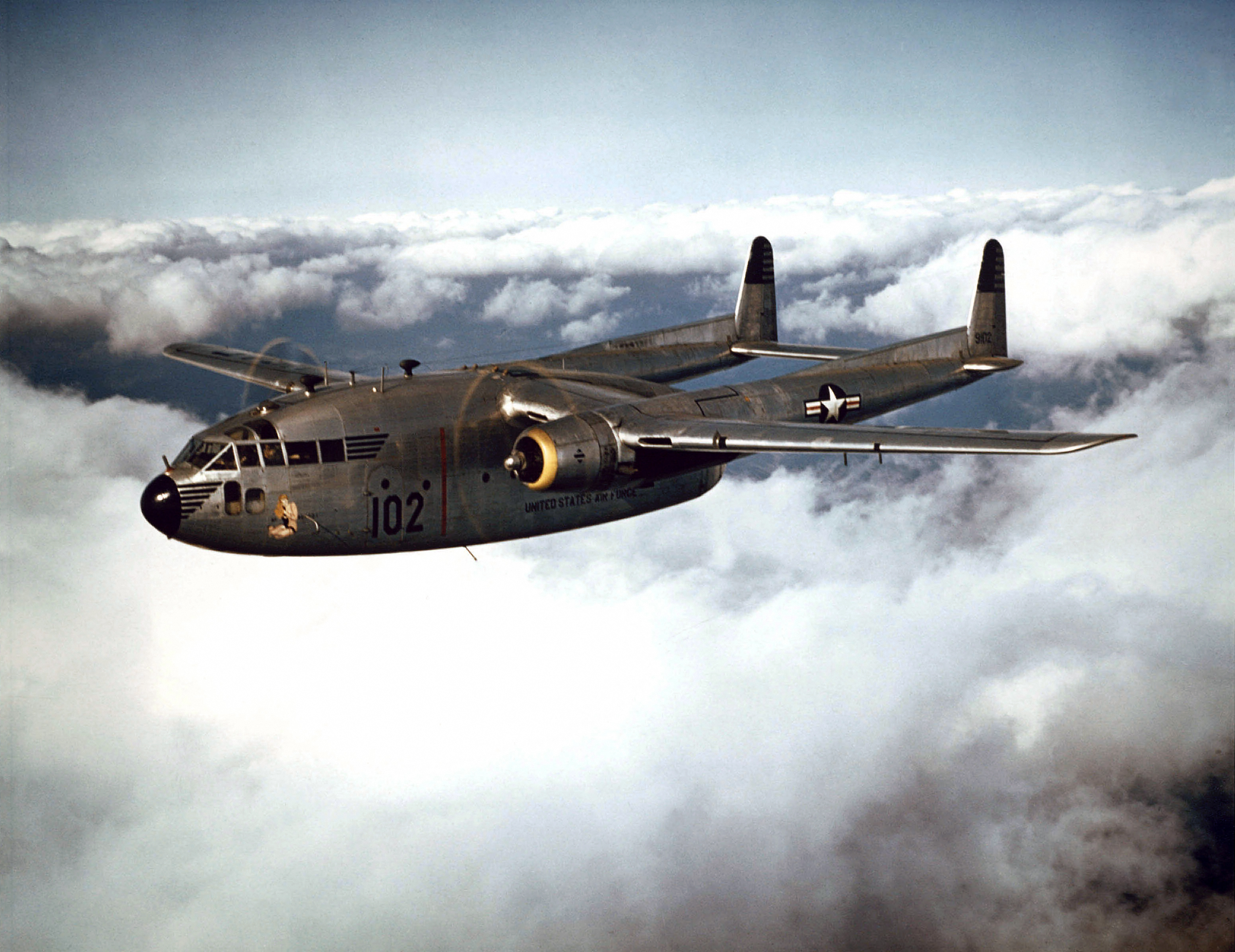
The C-119 Flying Boxcar was a US aircraft used extensively to airlift supplies and men to the Pusan Perimeter.

The Pacific airlift to Korea operated from the United States over three routes. These were commonly known as the "Great Circle" by pilots. One route left from McChord Air Force Base in Tacoma, Washington, and transited through Anchorage, Alaska, and Shemya in the Aleutians before finishing at Tokyo. This represented a distance of 5,688 miles (9,154 km) and a flying time of between 30 and 33 hours. A second route was the Mid-Pacific. This departed from Travis Air Force Base near San Francisco, California, and passed through Honolulu and Wake Island before arriving in Tokyo; the trip was 6,718 miles (10,812 km) and took 34 hours to complete. A third route was from California through Honolulu, and Johnston, Kwajalein, and Guam Islands to Tokyo: a distance of about 8,000 miles (13,000 km) and a flying time of 40 hours. The airlift moved about 106 tonnes (104 long tons; 117 short tons) a day in July 1950. From Japan most of the air shipments to Korea were staged at Ashiya or at the nearby secondary airfields of Itazuke Air Base and Brady Air Base.

The consumption of aviation gasoline during combat and resupply operations was so great in the early phase of the war, taxing the very limited supply available in the Far East, that it became one of the more serious logistical problems facing UN planners. Ocean tankers could rarely keep pace with the rate of consumption. Although the situation never forced the UN to halt its air operations, on several occasion the situation became quite dire, and was only rectified by the rapid procurement of supplies from Japan. On a number of occasions throughout the war, the demand of military consumption had the effect of leaving Japanese gas stations with no fuel to sell to the public.

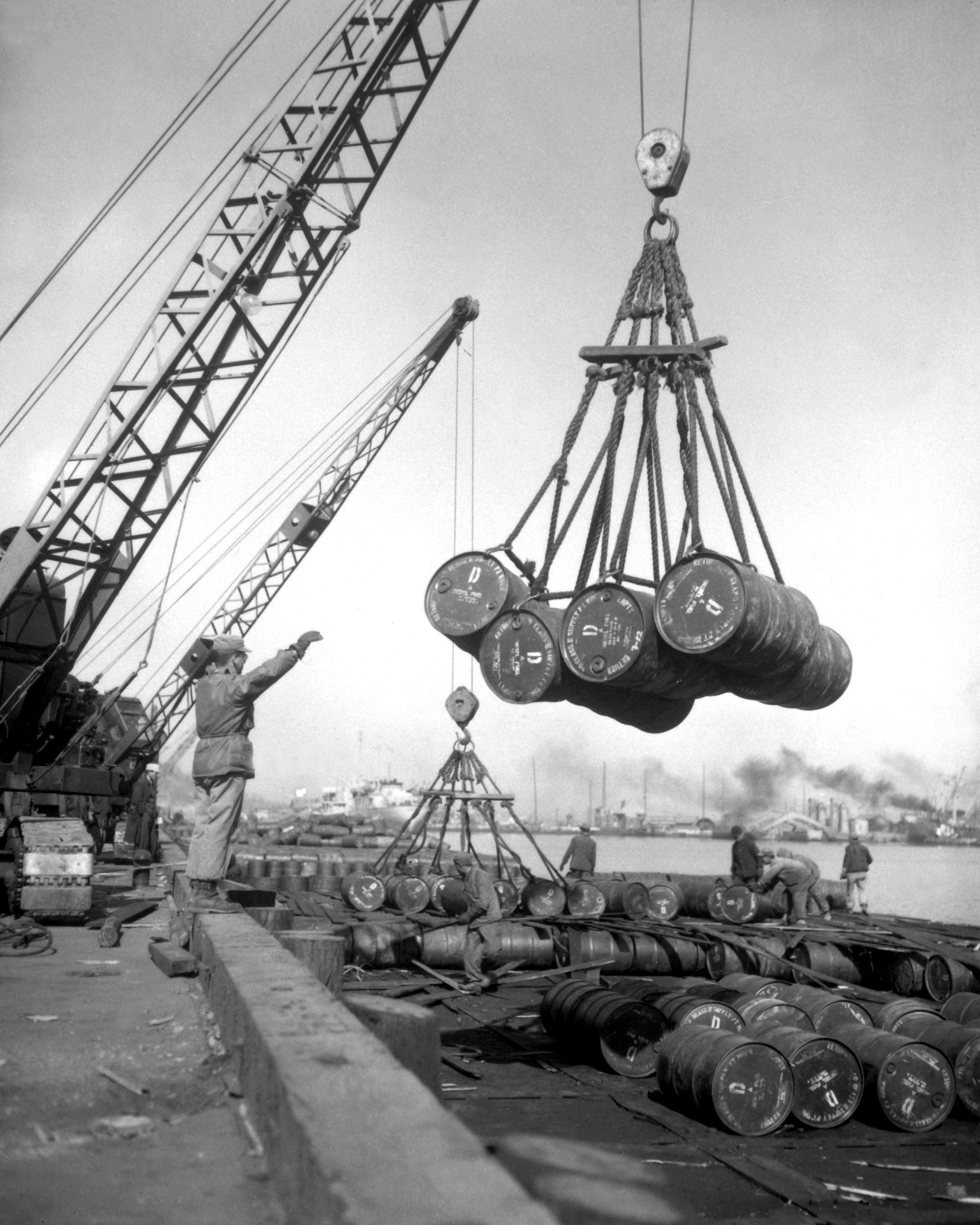
Fuel unloaded at Pusan. Gasoline shortages remained a serious logistical challenge for UN forces at Pusan.

The airlift of critically needed items from the United States tapered off at the end of July as surface transportation began to meet requirements. Some items such as the new 3.5-inch rocket were still being carried largely by airlift, 900 of them being scheduled daily for air delivery to Korea during August. The new 5-inch "shaped charge" rockets for Navy fighter planes, developed at the Navy's Inyokern, California, Ordnance Test Station, were at first delivered to Korea entirely by air. On July 29, a special Air Force plane picked up the first 200 warheads from Inyokern for delivery to the Far East.

After the first weeks of the war, steps were taken to reduce the necessity for the large number of airlifts to Korea from Japan. By July 15, Eighth Army was provided a daily ferry service from the Hakata-Moji area to Pusan, along with fast express trains from the Tokyo–Yokohama area. Accordingly, a Red Ball Express-type system was organized. It had a daily capacity of 300 tonnes (300 long tons; 330 short tons) of items and supplies that were critically needed in Korea. The Red Ball made the run from Yokohama to Sasebo in a little more than 30 hours, and to Pusan in a total of about 53 hours. The first Red Ball Express train with high priority cargo left Yokohama at 1330 on July 23. Regular daily runs became effective two days later. The schedule called for the Red Ball to depart Yokohama at 2330 nightly and arrive at Sasebo at 0542 the next morning. From there, the cargo would be transferred directly from the train to a ship. Ship departure was scheduled for 1330 daily and arrival at Pusan at 0400 the next morning.

The daily rail and water Red Ball Express from Yokohama to Sasebo to Busan began on July 23. By August it was operating with increased efficiency, demonstrating that it could promptly deliver any supplies available in Japan to Korea. On August 5, for example, it delivered 308 tonnes; on August 9, 403 tonnes; on August 22, 574 tonnes; and on August 25, 949 tonnes. The success of the Red Ball Express cut down the amount of airlift tonnage. This fell from 85 tonnes on July 31 to 49 tonnes on August 6. The express eliminated the need for nearly all airlift of supplies to Korea from Japan. It delivered supplies to Korea in an average time of 60–70 hours, while the airlift delivery varied from 12 hours to 5 days. The Red Ball delivery was not only more cost effective, it was more consistent and reliable.

The drop in air delivery to Korea caused Major General Earle E. Partridge, commanding the Far East Air Forces, to complain on August 10 that the Army was not fully using the airlift's 200 tonne daily capacity. That day, Eighth Army ordered curtailment of delivery by the Red Ball Express and increased use of the airlift to its maximum capacity. The reason given for this action was a sudden apprehension that the port of Pusan could not process the flow of water-borne supplies in a timely manner. The next day, upon Partridge's suggestion, two 2½-ton trucks were airlifted in a C-119 from Tachikawa Air Base in Japan to Taegu. The Air Force planned to airlift two trucks daily in this manner. As a result, on August 12, Eighth Army ordered the Red Ball Express be discontinued August 15 except on Tuesday and Friday of each week when it would carry cargo that was considered too difficult for the planes to handle. Under this arrangement airlift tonnage greatly increased. On August 16, transport planes carried 324 tonnes of cargo and 595 passengers; on August 19, 160 tonnes of cargo and 381 passengers; on 28 August, 398 tonnes of cargo and 343 passengers; and, on August 29, 326 tonnes of cargo and 347 passengers.

=== Sea resupply ===
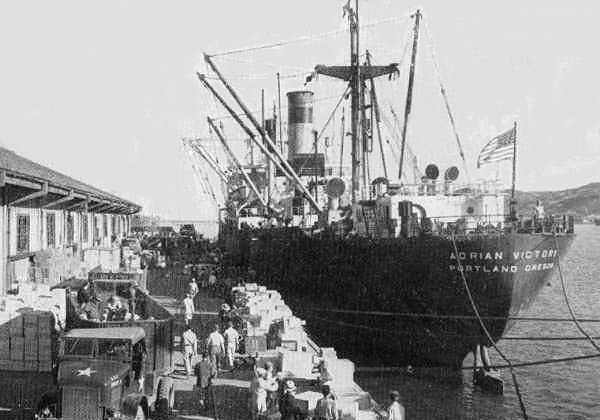
US ships unload cargo at Pusan port, 1950.

Most of the resupply by sea was conducted by cargo ships of the US Army and US Navy. The massive demand for ships forced the UN Command to charter private ships and bring ships out of the reserve fleet to augment the military vessels in service. The UN had a major advantage in its sealift operations in that the most developed port in Korea was Pusan which was at the southeastern tip of the peninsula. Pusan was the only port in South Korea that had dock facilities large enough to handle a sizable amount of cargo. Its four piers and intervening quays could berth 24 or more deepwater ships, and its beaches provided space for the unloading of 14 Landing Ship Tank (LST) vessels, giving the port a potential capacity of 45,000 tonnes (44,000 long tons; 50,000 short tons) daily. Seldom, however, did the daily discharge of cargo exceed 14,000 tonnes (14,000 long tons; 15,000 short tons) because of a lack of skilled labor, large cranes, rail cars, and trucks.

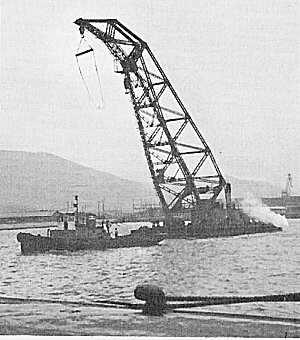
A 60-ton crane for offloading supplies is towed to Pusan, 1950.

The distance in nautical miles from the principal Japanese ports to Pusan varied depending on which Japanese port ships embarked from. It was 110 nautical miles (200 km; 130 mi) from Fukuoka, 123 nautical miles (228 km; 142 mi) from Moji, 130 nautical miles (240 km; 150 mi) from Sasebo, 361 nautical miles (669 km; 415 mi) from Kobe, and 900 nautical miles (1,700 km; 1,000 mi) from Yokohama via the Bungo-Suido strait. The sea trip from the west coast of the United States to Pusan for personnel movement required about 16 days; the trip for heavy equipment and supplies on slower shipping schedules took longer.

During the month of July 1950, a total of 309,314 tonnes (304,429 long tons; 340,960 short tons) of supplies and equipment were off-loaded at Pusan, at a rate of about 10,666 tonnes (10,498 long tons; 11,757 short tons) per day. The first heavy lift cranes arrived on July 23. A 60 tonnes (59 long tons; 66 short tons) crane and two crawler cranes, towed 900 miles (1,400 km) from Yokohama. Not until the first week of August did a 100 tonnes (98 long tons; 110 short tons) crane reach Pusan. In the last half of July, 230 ships arrived and 214 departed Pusan harbor. During this period, 42,581 troops, 9,454 vehicles, and 88,888 long tons (90,314 t) of supplies came ashore there. Subordinate ports of Ulsan and Suyong unloaded ammunition and petroleum products over the beaches from barges, tankers, and LCMs.

=== Movement to the front lines ===
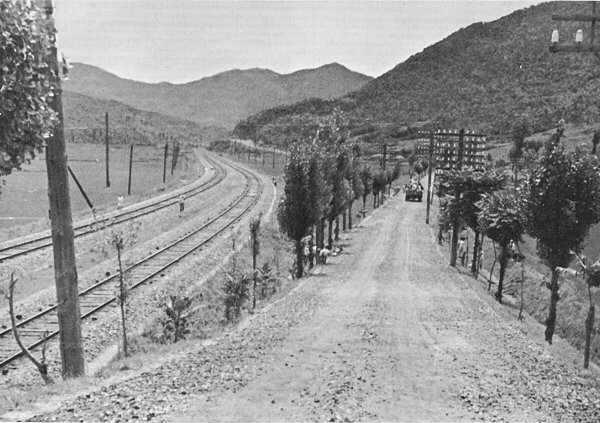
The main Seoul–Pusan railway and road was integral in bringing supplies to the front.

From Busan a good railroad system built by the Japanese and well ballasted with crushed rock and river gravel extended northward. Subordinate rail lines ran westward along the south coast through Masan and Chinju and northeast near the east coast to P'ohang-dong. There the eastern line turned inland through the east-central Taebaek Mountains area. The railroads were the backbone of the UN transportation system in Korea.

The 20,000 miles (32,000 km) of Korean vehicular roads were all of a secondary nature as measured by American or European standards. Even the best of them were narrow, poorly drained, and surfaced only with gravel or rocks broken laboriously by hand, and worked into the dirt roadbed by the traffic passing over. The highest classification placed on any appreciable length of road in Korea by Eighth Army engineers was for a gravel or crushed rock road with gentle grades and curves and one and a half to two lanes wide. According to engineer specifications there were no two-lane roads, 22 feet (6.7 m) wide, in Korea. The average width of the best roads was 18 feet (5.5 m) with numerous bottlenecks at narrow bridges and bypasses where the width narrowed to 11–13 feet (3.4–4.0 m). Often even on these roads there were short stretches having sharp curves and grades up to 15 percent. The Korean road traffic was predominately by oxcart. The road net, like the rail net, was principally north–south, with a few lateral east–west connecting roads.

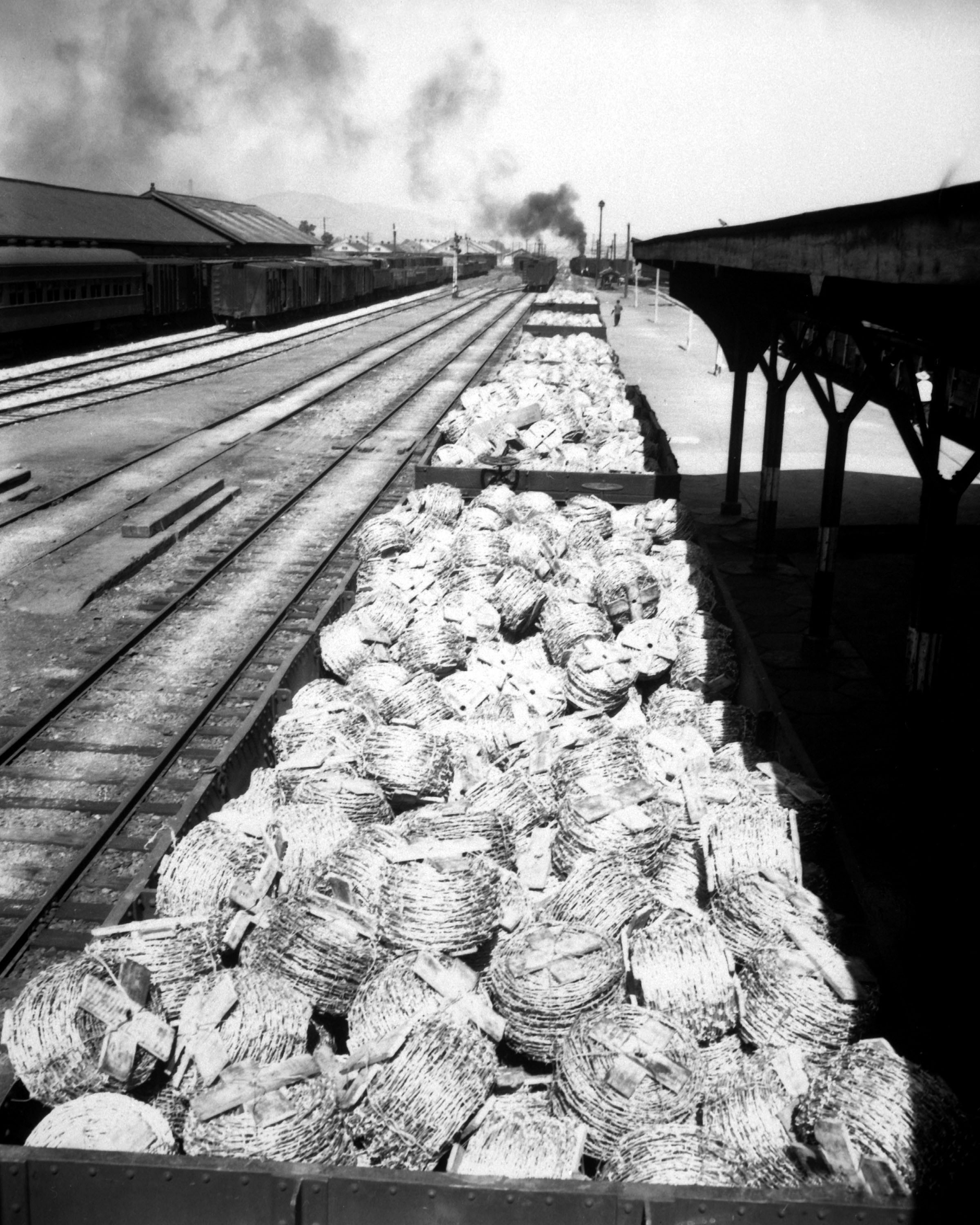
Barbed wire is moved along the Seoul–Pusan railway to the front lines, 1950.

US Army logistics units worked continuously during July to organize the train movements from Busan toward the rail-heads at the front. By July 18 they had established a regular daily schedule of supply trains over two routes, the main Pusan–Taegu–Kumch'on line with a branch line from Kumch'on to Hamch'ang; and the Pusan–Kyongju–Andong single track line up the east coast with a branch line from Kyongju to P'ohang-dong. As the battle front moved swiftly southward, trains after the end of July did not run beyond Taegu and P'ohang-dong. After the North Korean threat developed in the Masan region, a supply train ran daily from Pusan to that city. On July 1 the UN Command controlled 1,404 miles (2,260 km) of rail track in South Korea. By August this had shrunk to 431 miles (694 km) of track.

In July, 350 mixed trains moved from Pusan toward the front. These included 2,313 freight cars loaded with 69,390 short tons (62,950 t) of supplies. Also leaving Busan for the front were 71 personnel trains carrying military units and replacements. Among the trains returning to Pusan from the forward area were 38 hospital trains carrying 2,581 patients, and 158 freight cars loaded largely with personal belongings taken by unit commanders from their men in trying to strip them down to only combat needs. Since the Korean railroads had been built by Japan, repair and replacement items could be borrowed from the Japanese National Railways and airlifted to Korea within a very short time after the need for them became known. One of the largest and most important of rail purchases in Japan for use in Korea was 25 standard-gauge locomotives. By August 1 the ROK National Police was responsible for protecting all rail bridges and tunnels. Armed guards, their number varying with the importance of the structures, were stationed at each of them.

Occasionally, guerrillas would attack trains in rear areas of the Pusan Perimeter, usually in the Yongch'on–Kyongju area in the east or along the lower Naktong in the Samnangjin area. These attacks generally resulted in small numbers of UN casualties and minor damage to rail equipment. The most successful guerrilla attack behind the lines of the Pusan Perimeter occurred on August 11 against a VHF radio relay station on Hill 915, 8 miles (13 km) south of Taegu. A guerrilla force, estimated at 100 men attacked at 05:15, drove off the ROK police and set fire to the buildings. American casualties were two killed, two wounded, and three missing. When a ROK police force reoccupied the area later in the day the guerrillas had pulled back.

In August the UN also began using Korean civilians with A-frames as cargo carriers to move supplies up through the mountains to the front lines. This method of transport proved both cheaper and more efficient than using pack animals. American units obtained the civilian carriers through arrangements with the ROK Army. Soon the American divisions were using Korean labor for nearly all unskilled work, at an average of about 500 laborers and carriers to a division.

== North Korean logistics ==
The responsibility of the North Korean logistics was divided between the Ministry of National Defense (MND), led by Marshal Choe Yong Gun, and the NKPA Rear Service Department, commanded by General Choe Hong Kup. The MND was mainly responsible for railroad transportation and supply procurement, while the Rear Service Department was responsible for road transportation. The North Koreans relied on a logistical system which was very lean and substantially smaller than the United Nations' system. This logistics network was therefore capable of moving far fewer supplies, and this caused considerable difficulty for front line troops. Based on the efficient Soviet model, this ground-based network relied mostly on railroads to transport supplies to the front lines while troops transported those items onto the individual units on foot, trucks, or carts. This second effort, though more versatile, was also a substantial disadvantage because it was less efficient and often too slow to follow the moving front-line units.

=== Challenges ===
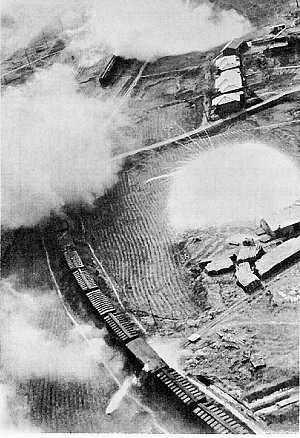
US aircraft attack a North Korean train with rockets and napalm, 1950.

In mid-July, the UN Far East Air Force (FEAF) Bomber Command began a steady and increasing attack on strategic North Korean logistics targets behind the front lines. The first of these targets was Wonsan on the east coast. Wonsan was important as a communications center that linked Vladivostok, Siberia with North Korea by rail and sea. From it, rail lines ran to all the North Korean build-up centers. The great bulk of Soviet supplies for North Korea in the early part of the war came in at Wonsan, and from the beginning it was considered a major military target. In the first heavy strategic bombing of the war, the FEAF hit the port city on July 13 with 400 tonnes (390 long tons; 440 short tons) of demolition bombs. Three days later, 30 B-29 bombers struck the railroad marshaling yards at Seoul, another major staging area for North Korean supplies.

UN bombers immediately targeted the pontoon bridge across the Han River at Seoul which was a main line of supply to the Pusan battlefield, and to destroy the repaired railroad bridge there. Several attempts in July by B-29s to destroy the rail bridge failed, but on July 29, 12 bombers succeeded in hitting the pontoon bridge and reported it as having been destroyed. The next day, 47 B-29s bombed the Chosen Nitrogen Plant at Hungnam on the northeast coast. In the meantime, carrier-based planes from the USS Valley Forge, which was operating in the Yellow Sea, destroyed six locomotives, exploded 18 cars of a 33-car train, and damaged a combination highway and rail bridge at Haeju on July 22.

By July 27, the FEAF Bomber Command had a comprehensive rail interdiction plan ready. This plan sought to cut the flow of North Korean troops and materiel from North Korea to the combat area. Two cut points, the P'yong-yang railroad bridge and marshaling yards and the Hamhung bridge and Hamhung and Wonsan marshaling yards would almost completely sever North Korea's rail logistics network. Destruction of the rail bridges over the Han near Seoul would cut rail communication to the Pusan Perimeter area. On July 28 the Far East Air Forces gave a list of targets in the rail interdiction program to the Bomber Command, and two days later a similar plan was ready for interdiction of highways. On August 3, the FEAF issued lists of targets for coordinated interdiction attacks south of the 38th Parallel to the Fifth Air Force and to the Navy. In general, the Han River divided the Fifth Air Force and FEAF Bomber Command zones.

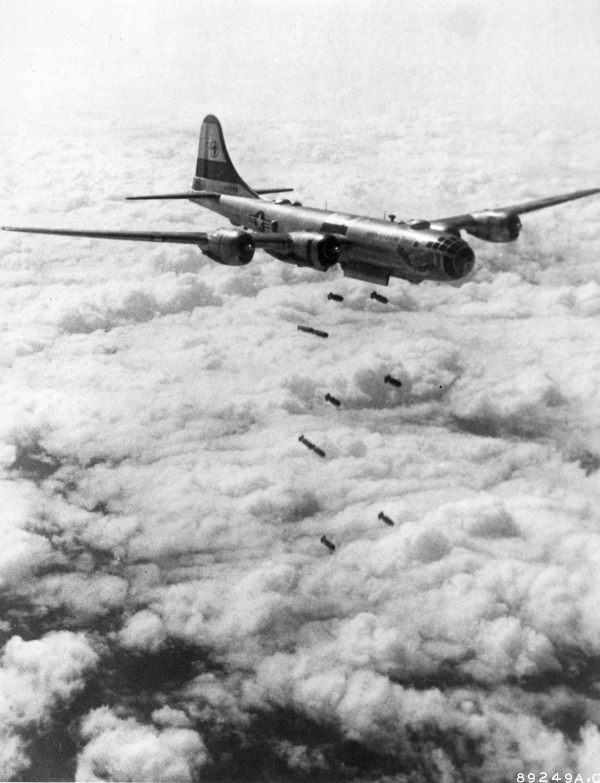
A B-29 Superfortress during a Korean War bombing run. B-29s conducted most of the air interdiction raids against North Korean supply lines.

On August 4, the FEAF began B-29 interdiction attacks against all key bridges north of the 37th Parallel in Korea, and on August 15 some light bombers and fighter-bombers joined in the interdiction campaign. This campaign sought the destruction of 32 rail and highway bridges on the three main transportation routes across Korea: the line from Sinanju south to P'yongyang and northeast to Wonsan on the east coast; the line just below the 38th Parallel from Munsan-ni through Seoul to Ch'unch'on to Chumunjin-up on the east coast; and the line from Seoul south to Choch'iwon and east to Wonju to Samch'ok on the east coast. The interdiction campaign marked nine rail yards, including those at Seoul, P'yongyang, and Wonsan, for attack, and the ports of Inch'on and Wonsan to be mined. This interdiction program, if effectively executed, would slow and perhaps critically disrupt the movement of North Korean supplies along the main routes south to the battlefront.

The US Air Force B-29s bombed and largely destroyed the P'yongyang Army Arsenal and the P'yongyang railroad yards on August 7. They bombed and completely destroyed the large Chosen petroleum refinery at Wonsan on August 7, 9, and 10. This plant, with its estimated capacity of 250,000 tonnes (250,000 long tons; 280,000 short tons), annually produced approximately 93 percent of the North Korean petroleum products. Throughout the month the US Air Force bombed the chemical complex in the Hungnam area, the largest in Asia, dropping 1,761 tonnes (1,733 long tons; 1,941 short tons) of bombs there in the period between July 30 and September 19. It bombed the Najin docks only 17 miles (27 km) south of the Siberian border and 10 miles (16 km) from Vladivostok. Najin was an important port of entry for vessels carrying supplies from Vladivostok and it was also a rail center. The bombers struck the metal-working industry at Songjin with 326 tonnes (321 long tons; 359 short tons) of bombs on August 28, and three days later they heavily damaged the aluminum and magnesium plants at Chinnamp'o with 284 tonnes (280 long tons; 313 short tons) of bombs.

=== Land resupply ===
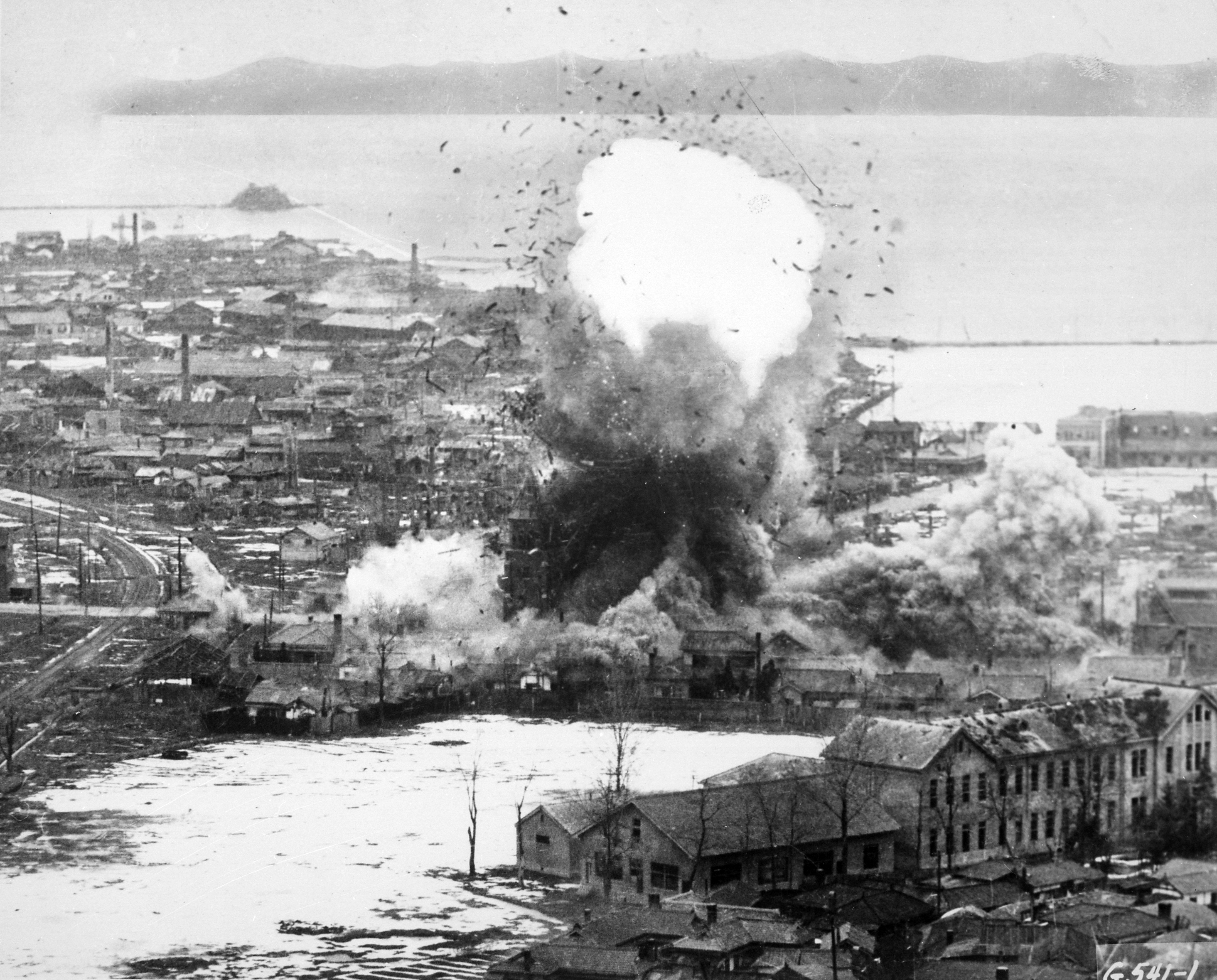
Wonsan under attack in 1951. Despite UN raids it remained one of North Korea's only ports that was developed enough for movement of small numbers of troops and amounts of logistics.

North Korea's lack of large airstrips and aircraft meant it conducted only minimal air resupply, mostly critical items being imported from China. Other than this, however, aircraft played almost no role in North Korean logistics. The North Koreans were also not able to effectively use sea transport to their advantage. Ports in Wonsan and Hungnam could be used for the transport of some troops and supplies, but they remained far too underdeveloped to support any large-scale logistical movements, and the port of Inchon in the south was difficult to navigate with large numbers of ships. The interior of Korea also lacked navigable waterways, as the shallow streams and rivers did not provide for the movement of large ships. These rivers would only be of local importance to battles. The North Koreans tried on several occasions to resupply their units by sea or conduct amphibious operations at the outbreak of the war but each time were decisively defeated. At engagements such as the Battle of Pusan and the Battle of Chumonchin Chan the UN naval blockade was effective in halting almost all North Korean naval activity.

This meant the railroads and highways in Korea took central prominence to North Korean resupply. The North Koreans were given supplies by both China and the Soviet Union, neither of whom were committed to the war at this point, and did not commit combat troops directly. They fed supplies into North Korea through six rail lines, five from Manchuria and one from Siberia. China in particular had an extensive rail network and thousands of locomotives. The railroads had the capacity to send up to 17,500 tonnes (17,200 long tons; 19,300 short tons) of supplies into North Korea per day. The full amount of supplies that were actually sent to North Korea at this phase of the war is unclear, but historians suggest that even at the height of the war and Chinese involvement the supplies did not increase beyond 13,000 tonnes (13,000 long tons; 14,000 short tons) per day. However the railroads were mostly oriented on north–south routes, making resupply from east to west difficult.

North Korean logistics held much more substantial facilities for their railroad system, which were based in Seoul. However, they also did not have the benefit of buying replacement and repair parts from Japan, and consequently their railroads were in much worse condition than those held by the UN. They controlled the bulk of Korea's 3,000 miles (4,800 km) of railroad. They also controlled most of the 1,500 locomotives and 9,000 rail cars on the peninsula, though most of these were not serviceable during the fight.

Seoul was also the focal point of Korea's highway network. It also had several crucial connection points to the Soviet Union and China, but it was not designed for military traffic and the weather conditions made travel on the roads difficult. Overall the roads into Korea provided only 48 percent of the capacity of the railroads.

=== Movement to the front lines ===
The supremacy of the Fifth Air Force in the skies over Korea forced the North Koreans in the first month of the war to resort to night movement of supplies to the battle area. They relied mostly on railroads to move supplies to the front, however a shortage of trucks posed the most serious problem of getting supplies from the trains to individual units, forcing them to rely on carts and pack animals.

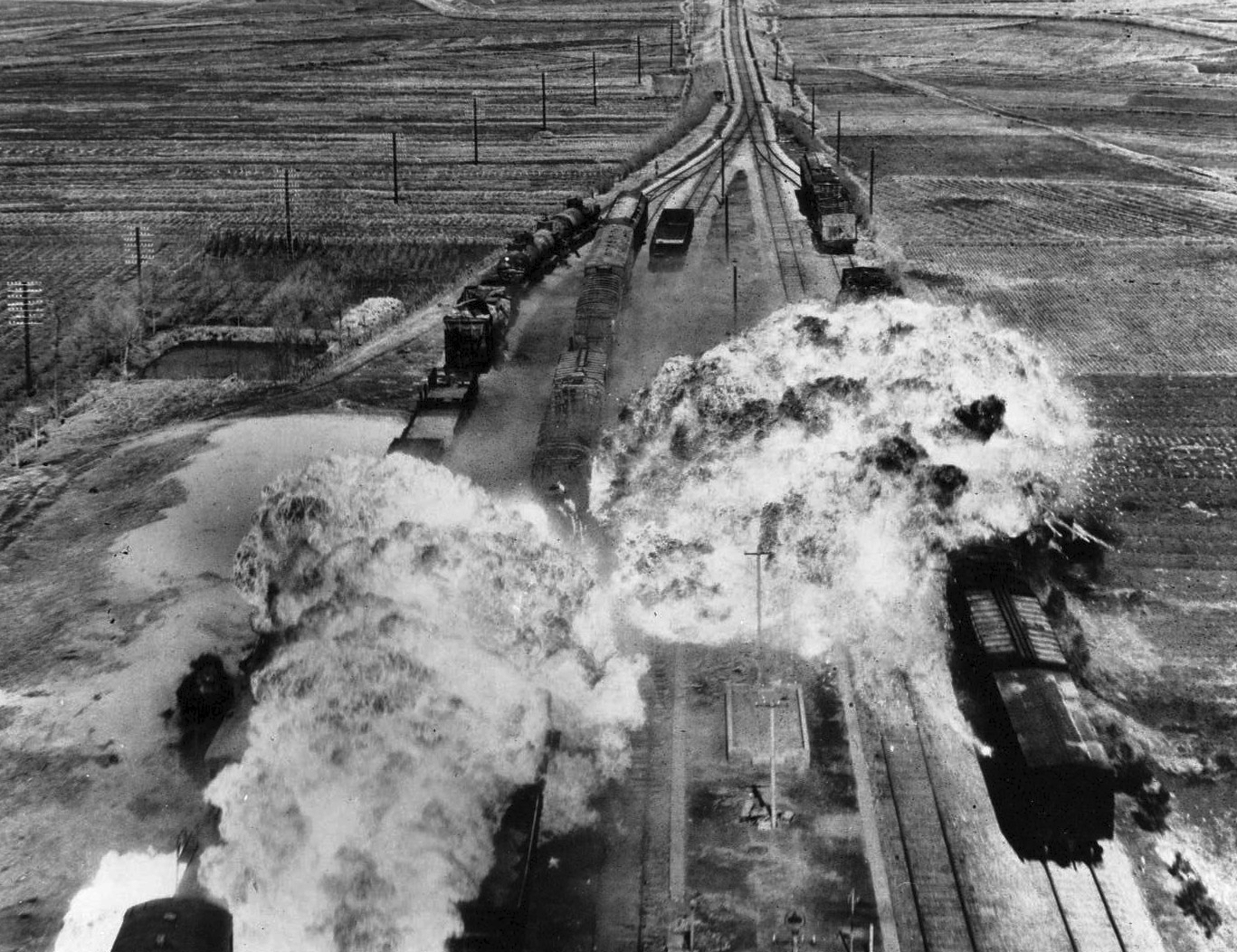
US planes attacking railroads south of Wonsan on the eastern coast of North Korea, 1950.

Since capturing Seoul, the North Koreans had built two pontoon bridges over the Han, one north and one south of the main rail and highway bridges. They had also started a new railroad bridge north of the old triple bridge group. The steel cantilever railroad bridge on the west still stood despite Far East Air Forces attempts to destroy it. For almost four weeks the Air Force bombed this bridge daily using bombs with fuze settings that were intended to damage both the superstructure and the abutments. On August 19, nine B-29s of the 19th Bombardment Group dropped 54 tonnes (53 long tons; 60 short tons) of bombs on the bridge, but it still stood. The same day, Navy carrier-based planes attacked the bridge, scoring eight direct hits, and brought it down.

Attacks against the Han River pontoon bridges at Seoul do not seem to have been successful until FEAF ordered the Bomber Command to lay delayed action bombs alongside the bridges on August 27, set to detonate at night. This method of attack seems to have caused such heavy casualties among the North Korean labor force trying to keep the pontoons in repair that they finally abandoned the effort. These bridges remained unfinished when the UN forces recaptured Seoul later in the year.

The North Korean People's Army was able to maintain transport to its front lines over long lines of communications despite heavy and constant air attacks. The United Nations air effort failed to halt military rail transport. Ammunition and motor fuel, which took precedence over all other types of supply, continued to arrive at the front, though in smaller amounts than before. There was still a considerable resupply of heavy weapons, such as tanks, artillery, and mortars, at the front in early September, although a steady decline in artillery can be traced from the middle of August. There was a sufficient supply of small arms ammunition, but a shortage of small arms themselves became apparent by mid-August and continued to worsen with each passing week. Rear areas were able to fill only about one third of the requisitions from the front for small arms in mid-August and resupply ceased entirely about the middle of September. New trucks were almost impossible to obtain. There was no resupply of clothing. At best there were rations for only one or two meals a day. Most units had to live at least partially off the South Korean populace, scavenging for food and supplies at night. By September 1 the food situation was so bad in the North Korean Army at the front that most of the soldiers showed a loss of stamina with resulting impaired combat effectiveness. At the same time, seriously wounded North Korean soldiers were often not transported to the rear for medical services, and many died while stranded on the front line.

The inefficiency of North Korean logistics remained a fatal weakness of the North Korean Army, costing it crucial defeats after an initial success with combat forces. The North Koreans' communications and supply were not capable of exploiting a breakthrough and of supporting a continuing attack in the face of massive air, armor, and artillery fire that could be concentrated against its troops at critical points.

Several units lost crucially needed supply lines in the middle of their offensives, particularly when crossing the Naktong River which had few stable bridges remaining. The NK 3rd Division stopped receiving food and ammunition supply as it pushed on Taegu in mid-August, forcing one of its regiments to withdraw from the captured Triangulation Hill. At Naktong Bulge, the NK 4th Division was able to establish a raft system for moving supplies across the river, but it still suffered serious food, ammunition, weapon, and equipment shortages after its August 5 crossing. It was also eventually turned back due to supply problems. The situation was most dire for units in the east, where rugged and mountainous terrain already posed a logistical challenge. The NK 5th Division and NK 12th Division attacking P'ohang-dong stopped receiving all food and ammunition supply between August 12 and August 20, a key factor in their defeat there. In some instances, desperate North Korean units forced South Korean populations to carry their supplies for them. North Korean units had advanced too far too quickly, and their logistical system, stretched beyond its limit, collapsed at a key point in the war. Morale remained high for many units despite the lack of supplies. North Korean units instead turned to foraging for what they could find in the countryside or raiding UN supplies. Small guerrilla units, such as the NK 766th Infantry Regiment, could do this effectively.

== Conclusions ==
Historians contend that for the UN and North Korea, locked in a bitter battle where neither could gain the upper hand, logistics was among the most important determining factors in how the war would progress. As the disparity in logistics capability widened between the UN and North Korean forces, the well-supported UN troops were able to hold their positions along the Pusan Perimeter, while the morale and the fighting quality of NKPA deteriorated as resupplies became increasingly unreliable. This trend ultimately culminated in the UN recapturing Seoul, the key logistics center of the battle, and the collapse of the North Korean logistics system with the entire NKPA.

As the battle for Pusan Perimeter wore on, logistics took an increasingly important toll on the outcome of individual engagements. UN units faced the challenge of re-equipping the ROK Army and supporting a massive force of troops in a large-scale war that it had not anticipated or planned for. Still, historians have praised US Army logistics planners for the way that they were able to organize a working logistics system for the UN forces in the battle. Upon the outbreak of the war, the United States had an overwhelming advantage in materiel which had been left behind from World War II, and it relied on this to supply units in the first crucial days while new materiel was produced and shipped into the theater. Air superiority was another critical advantage in the favor of the UN. A number of UN contributing nations provided large air forces so that materiel could be transported quickly. At the same time, US Army planners established Pusan port as the main port for supply delivery. The UN also had a great advantage in the port of Pusan itself as it was the most developed port in Korea and as a consequence had the capacity for large numbers of ships to offload supplies. With a large transcontinental navy and strong economic base in Japan, the UN forces were able to utilize the port effectively. These advantages ensured that UN forces had mostly stable lines of supply for the entirety of the battle.

North Korean troops had the advantage of planning the invasion in advance and organizing a pre-set logistics network, but they were not able to keep this logistics network running efficiently. Their largest disadvantage was the successful large-scale UN interdiction effort, as North Korean supplies and supply lines were subjected to UN bombing raids. This effort was not successful in stopping the North Korean supplies, and the North Koreans have also been praised by historians for the way in which they were able to maintain a supply network in the face of a massive bombing campaign. However, the North Koreans did suffer reduced supply because of this, and inefficiencies in transporting supplies from railroads to individual units negated the railroads' advantage. North Korean forces, though initially successful, were unable to counter UN forces with effective air defense, and were also unable to conduct successful interdiction of their own. This meant their supply network limited the combat actions that they could undertake; logistics could not keep up with units on the offensive, and North Korean units went almost completely unsupported during key engagements, reducing their ability to fight effectively. North Korean logistical inefficiency prevented them from overwhelming UN units in the Pusan Perimeter and enabled the defending UN troops to hold on long enough for a counterattack to be launched at Inchon. This landing, coming behind North Korean lines, had the effect of collapsing the North Korean front and ultimately ended the battle around Pusan in September.
