= Pang Ho-san =

North Korean general purged in 1959

Hero of the Republic Pang Ho-san
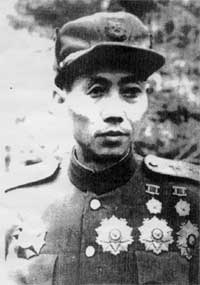

Personal details
- Born: 1906 or 1916 Kankyōhoku-dō (North Hamgyong Province), Korea, Empire of Japan
- Died: c. 1959 North Korea
- Party: Chinese Communist Party; Workers' Party of Korea
- Education: Counter-Japanese Military and Political University; Communist University of the Toilers of the East
- Awards: Hero of the Republic (twice); Order of the National Flag (First Class); Gold Star Medal
- Alias: Lee Cheon-bu

Military service
- Allegiance: Communist China; North Korea
- Branch/service: (Republic of China (1912–1949)) Eighth Route Army; People's Liberation Army; Korean People's Army
- Years of service: ?–c. 1959
- Rank: Army General
- Commands: Military University; 5th Corps; 6th Guards Division
- Battles/wars: See battles Korean independence movement: Pacification of Manchukuo; World War II: Pacific War; Tonghua Incident; Chinese Civil War: Linjiang Campaign; Winter Offensive (1947); Siping Campaign; Liaoshen Campaign; Korean War: Operation Pokpoong; Battle of Kaesong–Munsan; Battle of Gorangpo; Battle of Ongjin; Battle of Gimpo Peninsula; Battle of Bongilcheon; Battle of Oryu-dong; Battle of Sinsa-dong and Gwacheon; Battle of Siheung-Anyang-Suwon; First and Second Battles of Wonju; Battle of Masan; Battle of Nam River; Battle of the Notch; Hadong Ambush; Battle of Battle Mountain; Battle of Pusan Perimeter; Battle of Haman; Battle of Heartbreak Ridge

Korean name
- Hangul: 방호산
- Hanja: 方虎山
- RR: Bang Hosan
- MR: Pang Hosan

Pang Ho-san (Korean: 방호산; 1906 or 1916–c. 1959) was a Communist anti-Japanese activist and high-ranking military officer of the People's Republic of China and the Democratic People's Republic of Korea.

== Early life ==
Pang was born in North Hamgyong Province in 1906 or 1916. An interrogation report from the Allied Translator and Interpreter Section (ATIS) placed his age at 40 in 1950. In his youth, he joined the North Korean guerrillas to fight against the Japanese occupation of Korea.

His leadership talents were recognized during his service as a guerrilla fighter, and he was sent to the Soviet Union for military education from 1937 to 1939. In 1940, Pang joined the Chinese Communist Party's armed force and subsequently fought in World War II and the Chinese Civil War. In the aftermath of the Tonghua Incident, where Kuomintang agents and remnants of the Japanese Kwantung Army conspired to launch an armed uprising, Pang Ho-san ordered a massacre of 3,000 prisoners. Soldiers dragged them up to the city wall, where they were then stabbed and pushed down the icy river. He rose in the ranks of the newly established PLA, serving as political commissar of the PLA's 166th Division by 1948. During the Civil War, the Korean Independent Brigade was reorganized into the 4th Independent Division, with Pang serving as its political commissar. After Communist troops took Northeast China, the division was reorganized into the 166th Infantry Division, responsible for the defense of Shenyang. When the 166th Division was transferred to North Korean service in 1949, Pang was appointed commanding general of the unit which was reorganized as 6th Division of the Korean People's Army.

According to prisoner Sim Kwang-su, the entire 6,500-strong 166th Division was transferred on 30 July 1949 and upon reaching Sinuiju on 7 August, it was redesignated the 6th Infantry Division. After becoming part of the People’s Army, they conducted various weapons firing drills as well as mountain and night training. Their intensive training continued right up until the outbreak of war. According to US intelligence, at a conference in Harbin, the North Koreans and the Chinese concluded an agreement providing for the return of all North Korean volunteer and reserve troops, totaling 82,000, to their own country. Pang was one of the six Korean representatives at the meeting, but was reported as Political Commissar of the 4th Independent Division instead.

== Korean War ==
During the Korean War, Pang led the 6th Division and proved to be a highly talented commander. His unit crossed the Han River first through the Gimpo Peninsula, occupied the Chungnam and Honam areas, and massacred civilians in the occupied areas through the 6th Division and partisans under his control. Afterwards, the 6th Division was awarded the title of Guards Division for their achievements, such as advancing to Jinju and Masan. The Battle of Masan, where he commanded Northern forces, was one of the most important battles of the conflict, and it earned Pang a promotion to Lieutenant General. After going South, the 6th Division occupied Kaesong and Incheon, then disappeared from view in Yeongdeungpo, Seoul. Subsequently, they occupied Jinju, passing through Gunsan, Mokpo, Yeosu, Suncheon, and Hadong, before reappearing near Masan. U.S. forces, who belatedly discovered the 6th Division, were understandably astonished. At that time, General Walker, then Commander of the U.S. Eighth Army, praised: "The maneuver of the 6th Division of the North Korean Army was the best maneuver in the Korean War so far."

The Seoul Shinmun would later described Pang's 6th Division as: "[One] which included a large number of Koreans. Equipped with T-34 tanks, motorized regiments, and regular infantry regiments, it was an elite unit with many soldiers possessing combat experience. Although it was organized as a single division, its actual troop strength was equivalent to that of two divisions." They were also skilled in "deception tactics", some having disguised themselves as South Korean guerrillas to gain information on hostile defenders.

At the time, one-third of the People’s Army on the Nakdong River defense line consisted of people conscripted from South Korea. Professor Emeritus Heo Nam-seong, when consulted with the question of Pang choosing to halt his advance in Honam and not occupying Masan immediately, concluded: “If Pang Ho-san had advanced immediately without having to handle civil affairs, Masan would have been easily captured.” Heo drew this from the general's history in military administration, which included maintaining public order and mobilizing supplies, as Pang was a student at the Communist University of the Toilers of the East. Bae Dae-gyun theorized that Pang did not take Masan because he sought to weaken U.S. forces through combat instead of taking Kim Il-sung's territory-based approach.

In September 1950, the 6th Division was defeated and pursued as part of the UN Forces September 1950 counteroffensive, yet Pang managed to keep his unit largely intact and successfully managed its retreat northward. In October 1950 or January 1951, he was appointed as the 5th Corps' commander and commanded the battles on the Eastern Front, although the CIA believed Lieutenant General Pang Ho-san to be the Commander of the 4th Corps (later amended). By 1952, US military intelligence singled out Pang as the "best corps commander" of the North Korean military, assessing that he was a "first-class strategist" who inspired his troops, cared for their welfare, favored Chinese-inspired infiltration tactics, and generally avoided human wave attacks. By December, he was named Deputy Commander of the West Coast Command. According to the CIA, in November 1952, Choe Kwang succeeded him as Commander of the 5th Corps, while Pang was transferred to the General Headquarters Science Committee.

After the Korean War, Pang was lauded by the government and personally praised by Kim Il-sung. In June 1956, he was awarded the title of Hero of North Korea. Pang was conferred the title twice, becoming one among five "Double Heroes": Once for eliminating Chae Byong-duk at Hadong while commanding the 6th Division, and the second time for leading his division into hiding in Mount Jiri and moving 8,000 leftist figures along with remaining troops through the Taebaek Mountains without losses. The ROK-U.S. combined forces were completely unable to identify the 6th Division's retreat route, and the division crossed into the North, creating the myth of the so-called "Legendary 6th Division". He became acknowledged as the most victorious general on the North Korean side, but was also criticized for his unit's alleged atrocities.

== Death ==
In August 1958, Pang was appointed as the President of the Army War College. The CIA reported him heading the Academy as early as 25 March 1954. Yet he was eventually deemed to be a potential member of the "anti-Party" (or anti-Kim) movement, and was purged. The exact place and time of his death are unknown, but Pang was executed on Kim Il-sung's orders sometime in 1959.
