= Battle of the Notch =

1950 battle of the Korean War

- Part of the Korean War
Date	August 2, 1950
Location	South Korea
Result	UN victory

Belligerents
United Nations: United States; South Korea	North Korea

Commanders and leaders
(United States) Colonel Ned D. Moore	(North Korea) Pang Ho-san

Units involved
(United States) 19th Infantry Regiment (First Republic of Korea) Unorganized elements	(North Korea) 6th Infantry Division

Strength
2,335	500–4,572

Casualties and losses
117 killed, wounded or captured	2,654+ KIA

The Battle of the Notch was an engagement between United States and North Korean forces early in the Korean War on August 2, 1950, in southern South Korea. The fight ended in a victory for the United States after North Korean forces attempting to assault the US position were blocked and repelled repeatedly, suffering heavy casualties.

Reeling from the Hadong Ambush and being driven from the city of Chinju, the United States Army's 19th Infantry Regiment, 24th Infantry Division scrambled to protect a pass, known as "The Notch," into Masan, the final South Korean city before the Naktong River, where the UN was holding its Pusan Perimeter in place. North Korean and US forces unexpectedly ran into one another and a confused battle ensued. American forces were better equipped with heavy weapons and armor thanks to newly arrived equipment in the country, and their better ground during the battle allowed them to repel North Korean advances.

The North Korean force eventually withdrew after several unsuccessful attacks, having suffered heavy casualties. As it was disengaging from Masan, United States Air Force (USAF) aircraft caught the North Korean truck columns as they were retreating, inflicting significant damage on them and producing further casualties. This fight, with a number of smaller engagements in the region, effectively stopped the North Korean offensive on the southern flank of the Pusan Perimeter. It also gave both sides a reprieve from the fighting to resupply and re-enforce before engaging in the Battle of Pusan Perimeter shortly after.

== Background ==
=== Outbreak of war ===
Following the outbreak of the Korean War after the invasion of South Korea by North Korea, the United Nations decided to commit troops to the conflict on behalf of South Korea. The United States subsequently committed ground forces to the Korean peninsula with the goal of fighting back the North Korean invasion and to prevent South Korea from collapsing. However, US forces in the Far East had been steadily decreasing since the end of World War II, five years earlier, and at the time the closest forces were the 24th Infantry Division of the Eighth United States Army, which was headquartered in Japan. The division was understrength, and most of its equipment was antiquated due to reductions in military spending. Regardless, the 24th Infantry Division was ordered into South Korea.

The 24th Infantry Division was the first US unit sent into Korea with the mission to take the initial "shock" of Korean People's Army (KPA) advances, delaying much larger KPA units to buy time to allow follow on forces to arrive. The division was consequently alone for several weeks as it attempted to delay the KPA, making time for the 7th Infantry Division, 25th Infantry Division, 1st Cavalry Division, and other Eighth Army supporting units to move into position. Advance elements of the 24th Infantry Division were badly defeated in the Battle of Osan on July 5, during the first battle between American and North Korean forces. For the first month after the defeat of Task Force Smith, 24th Infantry Division soldiers were repeatedly defeated and forced south by the KPA's superior numbers and equipment. The regiments of the 24th Infantry Division were systematically pushed south in battles around Chochiwon, Chonan, and Pyongtaek. The 24th Infantry Division made a final stand in the Battle of Taejon, being almost completely destroyed but delaying KPA forces from advancing until July 20. By that time, the Eighth Army's force of combat troops were roughly equal to North Korean forces attacking the region, with new UN units arriving every day.

=== North Korean advance ===
With Taejon captured, KPA forces began the effort of surrounding the Pusan Perimeter from all sides in an attempt to envelop it. The KPA 4th and the 6th Divisions advanced south in a wide maneuver. The two divisions were coordinating to envelop the UN's left flank and were extremely spread out. They advanced on UN positions pushing back US and South Korean forces repeatedly. Forces of the 3rd Battalion, 29th Infantry Regiment, newly arrived in the country, were wiped out at Hadong in a coordinated ambush by KPA forces on July 27, leaving open a pass to the Pusan area. Soon after, Chinju to the west was taken, pushing back the 19th Infantry Regiment and leaving routes to the Pusan open for North Korean forces.

Reeling from the loss, UN planners hastily moved reserve forces to the southwest to repel North Korean advances. Several US infantry regiments as well as the command post of the 24th Infantry Division moved to establish new positions to prevent KPA forces from advancing from Chinju. American forces moved to defend the city of Masan, the last key city before the KPA reached the perimeter. Located in the mountainous region along South Korea's southern coast, Masan was accessible by two routes from the west. Major General John H. Church, the 24th Infantry Division's commander, emplaced the 19th Infantry Regiment and the 27th Infantry Regiment in the area to defend Masan. Eventually, the 27th set up along the southern entrance while the 19th Infantry covered the north, in a pass known as "The Notch," (35.215°N 128.312°E) southwest of Chungam-ni. The entire 19th Infantry Regiment, reeling from the fight at Chinju and attempting to hold back North Korean advances, fell back to the Notch.

== Battle ==
The 1st Battalion, 19th Infantry was assigned to hold the Notch and the high ground on the right flank, to the northwest. Republic of Korea Army (ROKA) troops led by Colonel Min would hold the high ground to the southwest of the Notch. Meanwhile, 2nd Battalion, 19th Infantry withdrew to reserve positions at the northern base of the pass. During the evening of July 31, 1st Battalion, 29th Infantry also arrived in the region. More importantly, A Company of the 8072nd Medium Tank Battalion, armed with M4 Sherman medium tanks rebuilt in Japan, arrived at Masan, some of the first heavy armor the UN had in the war. One platoon of A Company's tanks went to the 27th Infantry in the south while the 19th Infantry in the north got the other half. This put the force of the 19th Infantry and supporting units at 2,335 under the command of Colonel Ned D. Moore, excluding the South Korean forces.

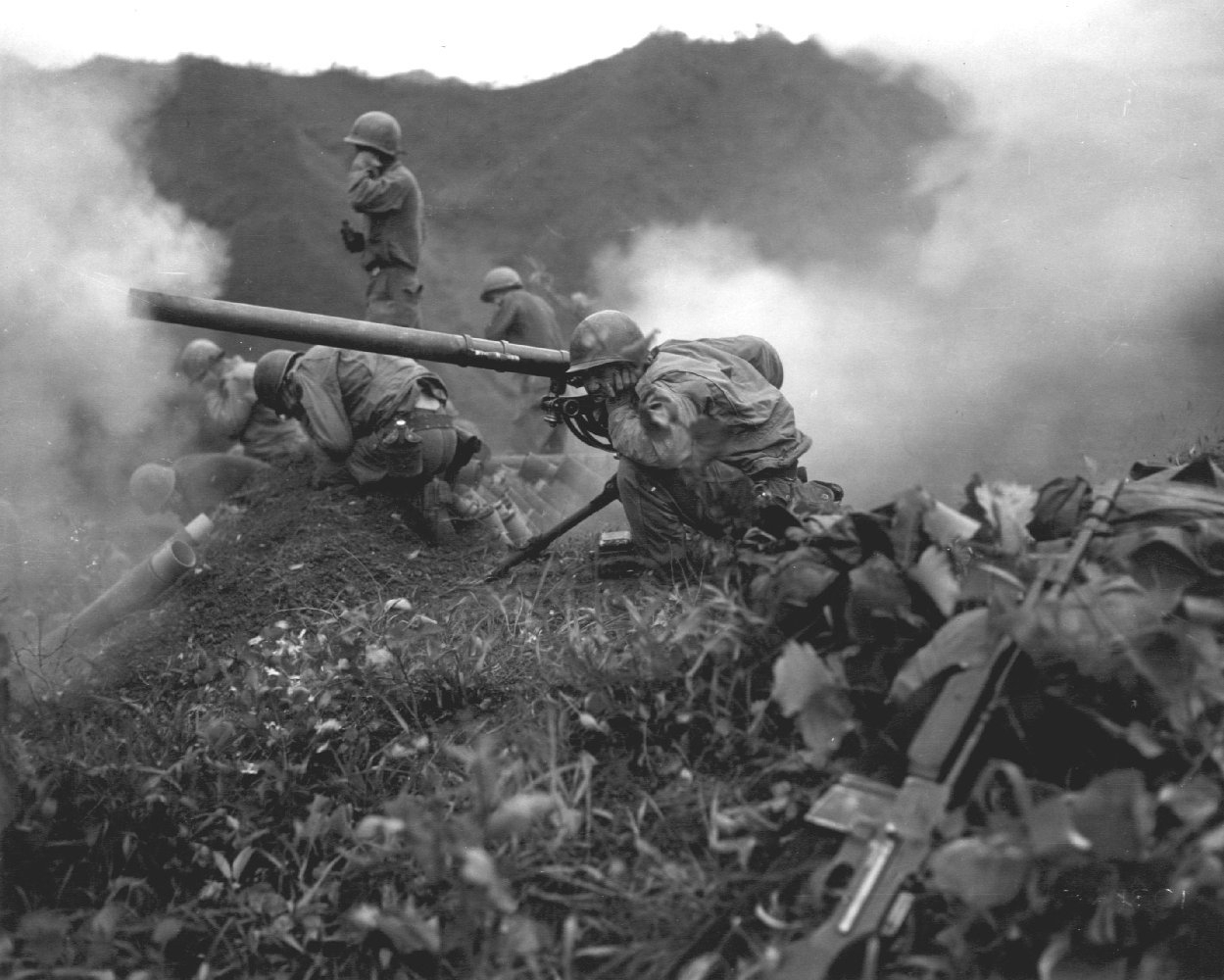
M20 recoilless rifles in action. These weapons were used at the Notch against North Korean machine gun positions

The number of North Korean forces committed to the region is not known, however later research suggests that the KPA 6th Division committed at least a battalion to the fight, and it is likely that an entire regiment was ordered to advance on the Notch and Masan. This would put the number of KPA involved in the battle between 500 and 2,000.

=== Attack ===
At 06:45 on August 2, C Company, 1st Battalion, 19th Infantry began to move out from its positions on a reconnaissance patrol supported by tanks and armored cars. Before the armored column left the lines, it ran head-on into a North Korean attack starting on the Notch, as mortar fire and three heavy machine guns opened up on it from 200 yards (180 m) below the crest of the pass. The road before the pass erupted into a frantic and confused struggle, C Company in the lead was struck with machine gun fire, killing most of its 1st Platoon before the men could disembark from their trucks. American soldiers who dove for cover in the ditches along the road found KPA soldiers already in cover there. The lead M4 was struck with mortar fire and destroyed, while anti-tank weapons set at least one American truck on fire. During this fight, advancing KPA troops captured at least a few of the surprised American soldiers, using them as human shields when advancing up the high ground where the rest of the UN force was firing down at them. In the end, the initial ambush cost the Americans about 30 casualties. C Company overcame several North Korean attempts to cut them off before withdrawing back to the American lines.

American forces were quick to counter the attack. M20 recoilless rifles destroyed the machine gun positions, and American mortars began firing on any North Korean positions they could locate. However, KPA forces were quick to advance up the Notch, to the crest of the hill that made up the pass. There, they discovered B Company, 19th Infantry, encamped. The 19th Infantry was apparently not prepared for combat, as KPA forces were able to hit the American force and drive it off the hill, killing several of the American soldiers with bayonets. At about 12:00, B Company was driven from the crest of the Notch, and further confusion erupted when USAF aircraft accidentally strafed the retreating B Company. Neighboring positions also mistakenly attacked B Company, which retreated with 12 killed.

ROKA forces, meanwhile, had emplaced in the wrong position, 1 mile (1.6 km) too far south, and were not in contact with 19th Infantry. The ROKA forces were subsequently hit with friendly and enemy fire, and in the confusion the 19th Infantry attempted to block the South Koreans from advancing, thinking them enemy forces. North Korean snipers were able to infiltrate the rear of the position and kill five UN soldiers with shots to the back of the head. However American forces repelled several advances on the right flank. The M4 Shermans gave the American force a superiority in armor over the KPA for the first time, and were crucial in pushing back each attempted KPA advance. North Korean infantry, unsupported by armor of their own, suffered heavy casualties from the American forces in their positions on the high ground.

=== North Korean withdrawal ===
Fighting at the Notch continued through the afternoon, but, the attack still unsuccessful, the North Korean troops withdrew suddenly in the mid-afternoon, allowing American forces to recover most of the casualties and vehicles from the Notch. In the meantime, they set up roadblocks to prevent further KPA attacks from moving down the road. KPA forces disengaged from the fight without attempting to flank the Americans, and by nightfall they were out of the region. In the meantime, the 27th Infantry Regiment surprised a large KPA column advancing on the south road and captured many trucks of supplies. During the North Koreans' retreat from the two roads, USAF planes mounted an airstrike and inflicted heavy casualties.

== Aftermath ==
The American forces reported 57 killed, 37 wounded, 17 missing and 6 captured, for a total of 117 casualties from the 19th and 29th Infantry Regiments. This number was far lighter than casualties for other unit actions of similar size so far in the war. North Korean casualties are unknown but believed to be far heavier than the American force. Actions in the Notch, as well as attacks on the region for the next few days are known to have largely destroyed the KPA 6th Division, and over 50 percent of its force became casualties in the fighting.

The fight was one of the first victories for UN forces in the war. In stopping the North Korean advance at the Notch and around Masan, the UN forces were able to halt the progress of the KPA 4th and 6th Divisions, grounding their flanking moves to a halt and forcing them to withdraw to rebuild and re-supply. In the meantime, the UN forces along the perimeter were being reinforced by heavier infantry and armor formations every day. The KPA defeat and retreat around the Masan region allowed both sides several critical days of reprieve from battle. This would end when the KPA began its final offensive on the UN forces in its coordinated assault on the Pusan Perimeter.
