= Hadong Ambush =

Battle during Korean War

- Part of the Korean War
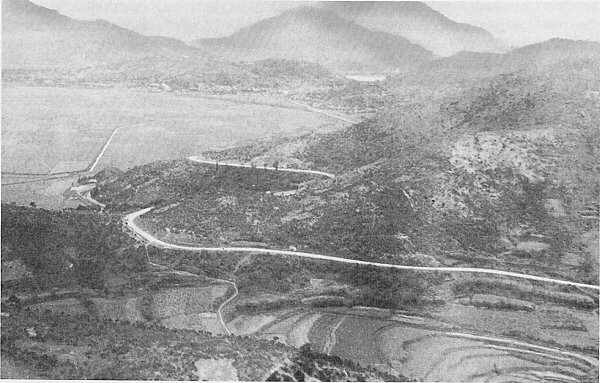
- Hadong Pass, site of the ambush, several weeks later
Date	July 27, 1950
Location	Hadong, South Korea 35°05′N 127°52′E
Result	North Korean victory

Belligerents
United Nations: United States	North Korea

Commanders and leaders
Harold W. Mott; George F. Sharra	Pang Ho San

Units involved
3rd Battalion, 29th Infantry	6th Infantry Division

Strength
925	~500

Casualties and losses
307 killed 495 total casualties	Unknown
- Location within South Korea

The Hadong Ambush was an engagement between United States and North Korean forces, occurring on July 27, 1950, in the village of Hadong in southern South Korea, early in the Korean War. The fight ended in a North Korean victory following a successful ambush of US forces which resulted in heavy American casualties.

The US Army's 3rd Battalion, 29th Infantry Regiment, a newly formed unit consisting mostly of inexperienced new arrivals, was ordered to move to the South Korean village of Hadong to hold the pass there against advancing forces of the North Korean People's Army (KPA). Unprepared for combat, the UNC forces walked into an ambush in which most of the battalion's command staff was killed in the pass, leaving lower-ranking soldiers to mount a disorganized defence against North Korean troops occupying prepared positions on higher ground.

For three hours, the battalion fought, pinned in a crossfire by North Korean soldiers on higher ground. North Korean forces were able to divide the American force and kill most of its commanders, further disorganizing the men. Following the failed operation, the wounded US commander ordered a withdrawal, which quickly became disorganized, resulting in hundreds of casualties. Destroyed after its first engagement, the 3rd Battalion, 29th Infantry Regiment was disbanded and merged with other units as the North Korean forces advanced through the pass and attacked US positions to the east.

== Background ==
=== Outbreak of war ===
Following the invasion of South Korea by North Korea, and the subsequent outbreak of the Korean War as a result, the United Nations decided to commit troops to the conflict on behalf of South Korea. The United States subsequently sent ground forces to the Korean peninsula with the goal of fighting back the North Korean invasion and to prevent South Korea from collapsing. However, US forces in the Far East had been steadily decreasing since the end of World War II in 1945, and at the time the closest forces were the 24th Infantry Division of the Eighth United States Army, which was headquartered in Japan. The division was understrength, and most of its equipment was antiquated due to reductions in military spending. Regardless, the 24th Infantry Division was ordered into South Korea.

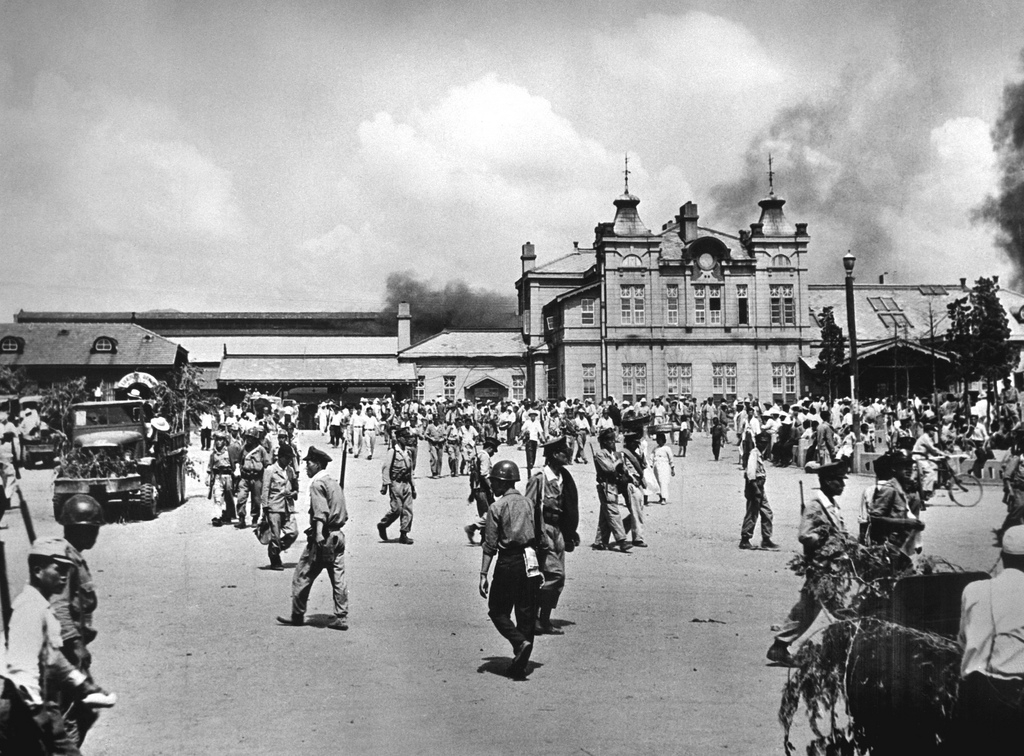
US Forces retreat during the Battle of Taejon

The 24th Infantry Division was the first US unit sent into Korea with the mission to take the initial "shock" of North Korean advances, delaying much larger KPA units to buy time to allow follow-on forces to arrive. The division was consequently outnumbered and outgunned for several weeks as it attempted to delay the KPA, making time for the 7th Infantry Division, 25th Infantry Division, 1st Cavalry Division and other Eighth Army supporting units to move into position. Republic of Korea Army (ROK) forces in the meantime were systematically defeated and forced south along Korea's east coast, with entire divisions being overrun by the KPA's superior firepower and equipment. Advance elements of the 24th Infantry Division were badly defeated in the Battle of Osan on July 5, during the first battle between American and North Korean forces. For the first month after the defeat of Task Force Smith, 24th Infantry Division soldiers were repeatedly defeated and forced south by the KPA's superior numbers and equipment. The regiments of the 24th Infantry Division were systematically pushed south in battles around Chochiwon, Chonan, and Pyongtaek. The 24th Infantry Division made a final stand in the Battle of Taejon, being almost completely destroyed but delaying North Korean forces from advancing until July 20. By that time, the Eighth Army's force of combat troops were roughly equal to North Korean forces attacking the region at around 70,000 for each side, with new UN units arriving every day.

=== Replacements arrive ===
On July 20, 400 hastily assembled US Army recruits arrived in Okinawa aboard the USS Walker. The inexperienced soldiers were assigned to the 29th Infantry Regiment, 2nd Infantry Division, a command that was preparing other battalions to move into Korea and to relieve the other units of the 24th Infantry Division. The new formations, now consisting mostly of soldiers who had no combat experience and grouped into two battalions, were immediately sent into Pusan. The headquarters of the regiment remained behind to form a new regiment. This regiment would originally be in charge of the defense of Okinawa but would later be rushed into Korea. The two battalions landed in Pusan on July 21 and were assigned to the 19th Infantry Regiment, 24th Infantry Division, but they retained their designations as the 1st and 3rd Battalions of the 29th Infantry Regiment. Instead of being given time to train and prepare to enter the front lines, the battalions were immediately sent to the regiment's sector at Chinju. By July 22, the units were on the front lines with new equipment. The equipment, fresh from production lines, was not prepared for combat, despite promises from several commanders that the unit would be given time to do so.

== Battle ==
American planners believed that the Hadong area was under attack from elements of the KPA 4th Division, having just received replacements following its victory at Taejon. However, the soldiers in the area were actually from the KPA 6th Division under the command of General Pang Ho San. The two divisions were coordinating to envelop the UN's left flank and were extremely spread out. Therefore, only groups of a few hundred were advancing through the region, some with small numbers of tanks.

=== Arrival ===
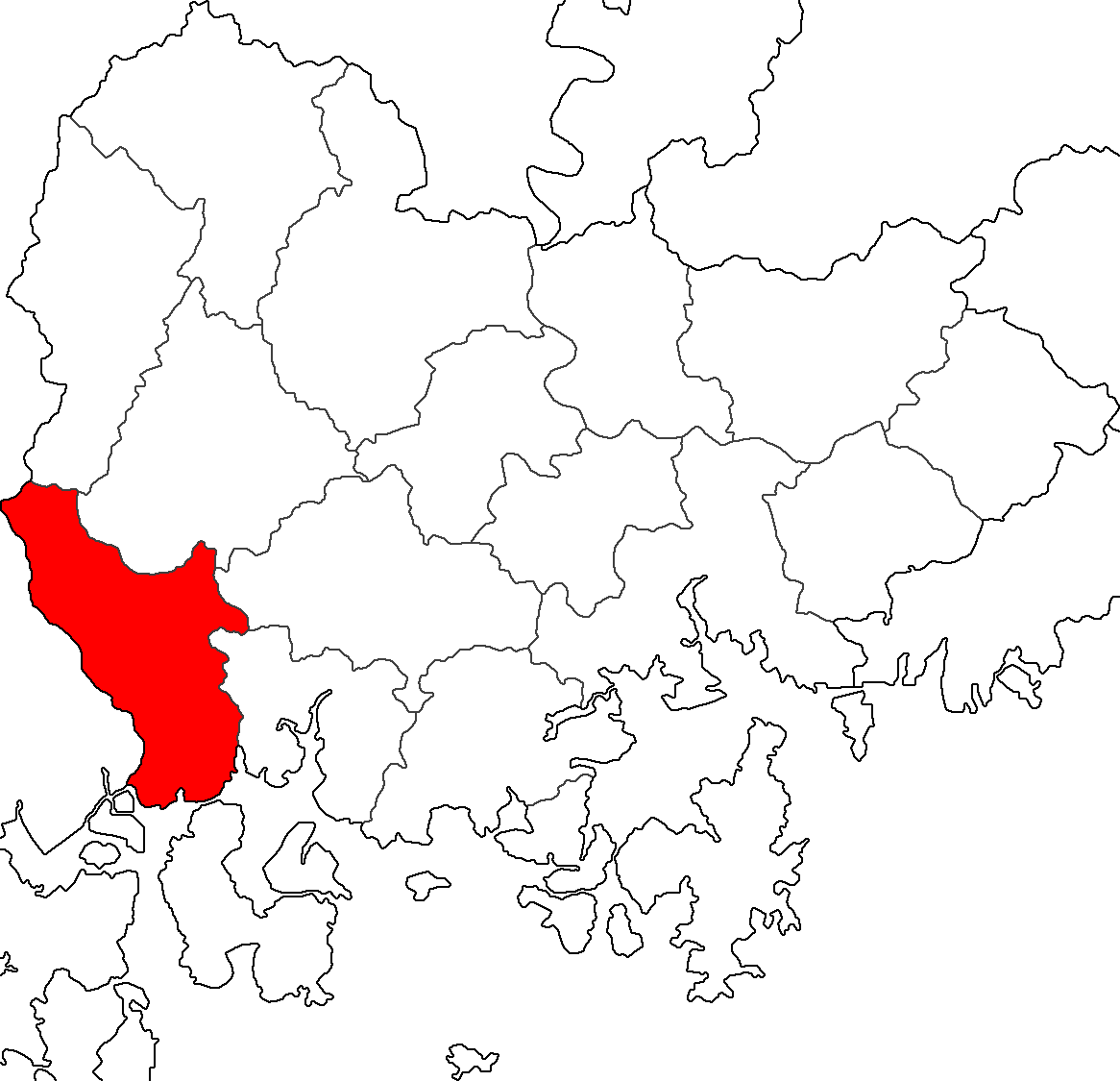
Hadong county, South Korea, area of the ambush

Immediately after arrival, the commanding officer of the 19th Infantry Regiment, Colonel Ned D. Moore, ordered the 3rd Battalion, 29th Infantry to move out and seize the Hadong pass, a road junction 35 miles (56 km) southwest of Chinju, where about 500 North Korean soldiers were reported to be moving. Eighth Army had also received reports that the KPA had been fighting South Korean police who were resisting in the village of Hadong, 1 mile (1.6 km) west of the pass. The battalion commander, Lieutenant Colonel Harold W. Mott, alerted his troops, and at 00:30 on July 26, the battalion departed alone on its mission. It had a strength of 925 men. The battalion was to hold the pass, a southern route into Pusan, from any advancing North Korean forces. Hadong was seen as a significant path into Chinju, despite its lack of defenses.

The North Koreans, in the meantime, advanced to Hadong and captured the village which was lightly defended by a group of South Korean police, as no military was available due to manpower shortages. The KPA 6th Division set up in roads east of the village and began sending probes and scout parties to the east. The move was part of a larger coordinated operation by the 6th Division to take Chinju, and then Masan, in hopes of flanking the UN lines at their vulnerable southern limit. Thinking the UN units were disorganized and suffering low morale, KPA 6th Division commander General Pang Ho San ordered his forces to aggressively advance to Chinju as quickly as possible.

Accompanying the 3rd Battalion was South Korean Major General Chae Byong-duk, South Korea's Army Chief of Staff who had been relieved after the fall of Seoul. Having fallen out of favor with the South Korean command, Chae was to be an interpreter and guide for 3rd Battalion on its mission. He accompanied the battalion with only a few of his aides. The battalion was forced to take several detours through Konyang because of impassable roads, and it was delayed in its arrival to Hadong. Shortly before dawn, the troops encountered a truck of 15 South Korean militia who claimed they were the remains of a 400-man unit that had been wiped out by KPA forces in the area. Mott sent his executive officer back to the command post to ask Moore for further instructions, and Moore ordered them to proceed with the mission. Because the battalion had no radio equipment it was forced to send a runner to relay this information, and he returned by nightfall, forcing the battalion to encamp in the village of Hoengchon, 3 miles (4.8 km) west of Hadong, for the night.

=== Ambush ===
At 08:45 on July 27 the battalion moved out towards the Hadong pass, arriving within an hour. When it was within 1,000 yards (910 m) of the pass, L Company at the head of the formation spotted a North Korean patrol. The company's heavy weapons were fired at the patrol, forcing it to withdraw but causing no casualties. L Company then rushed the pass and dug in at 09:30, waiting for a scheduled airstrike on the village of Hadong 1 mile (1.6 km) to the west at 09:45. Behind L Company was the battalion command group, followed by K and M Companies, with I Company covering the rear. The battalion's command group, including Mott, Chae and most of the senior officers, approached the pass as L Company took cover on the left side of the road. As they approached the pass, a company of KPA soldiers was spotted up the road, part of a scouting party looking to probe further east. L Company was preparing to ambush the North Koreans when they got closer, but before this could happen, Chae called out to the Koreans demanding they identify themselves. The North Koreans immediately ducked for cover in the ditches on the side of the road, and L Company opened fire on them.

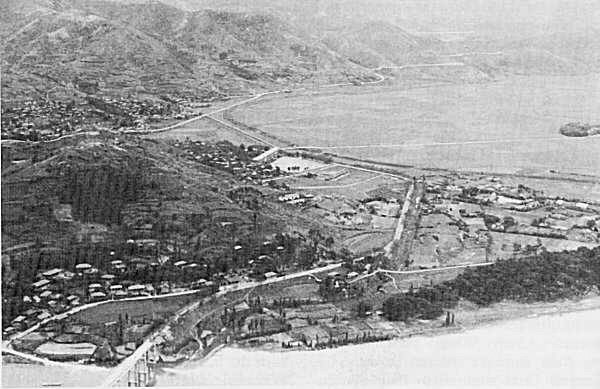
Hadong village, 1950

Immediately, the American forces were hit with machine gun and mortar fire from the north ridge, where North Korean troops had been dug in. The first burst of machine gun fire killed Chae and wounded most of the other commanders, including Mott. Mott managed to make it to the ditch where American forces dug him a foxhole, but soon after all the Americans in his vicinity were killed or withdrew and he was left alone and unable to communicate with the rest of the battalion. The KPA had the US battalion in a crossfire on higher ground, both from the pass and from the ridge. Mortar fire knocked out many parked vehicles, including the radio jeep of a US Air Force tactical air-control party which was to direct airstrikes. During the fight two flights of US aircraft flew over the area trying in vain to contact the party, and when unable to do so, left the area without making any strikes.

The 3rd Battalion had walked into a prepared North Korean ambush, suffering a bombardment of mortar and machine gun fire from prepared and hidden positions, and almost its entire command group was eliminated within a minute of the first shot being fired. L Company, at the pass, was heavily engaged with the KPA forces higher on the hill. The company's 1st Platoon sustained a direct assault on its foxholes, with two members of the company killed by bayonets. L Company was separated from the rest of the battalion by KPA forces advancing on its position further up the ridge. K Company attempted to move up to relieve it but was unable to do so. However, the company held in place. Meanwhile, I Company began moving up the hill to provide support. KPA forces were able to cut the battalion into disorganized groups, with L Company engaging forces in the pass and I Company under attack from forces on the north ridge behind them. By noon, the North Korean forces on the higher ground had enveloped the American forces.

=== American withdrawal ===
At 12:00, Mott was brought to the position of L Company commander Captain George F. Sharra. Mott ordered Sharra to take command and organize a retreat. Sharra ordered his three platoons to withdraw. A KPA battalion began moving down the pass towards the American positions. Men of I Company were forced to withdraw through rice paddies south of the pass, being strafed by mortar and machine gun fire in the process. They also had to cross a 20-foot (6.1 m)-wide stream in the retreat, and some drowned in the process. Most of the Americans were forced to discard weapons, equipment and clothing in the retreat. Many of the men of L Company, as well as some of the wounded, were able to evacuate by truck.

Survivors from 3rd Battalion disengaged from the battle in groups. The largest group of 97 survivors moved 5 miles (8.0 km) south to the small port of Noryangjin where a fishing vessel carried them out to a Republic of Korea Navy patrol boat. Other groups of soldiers escaped into the hills while some had to fight their way back to Chinju. Most of the battalion's officers were casualties in the fight, and the scattered and disorganized retreat destroyed the battalion. Stragglers continued to wander into the 19th Infantry's lines throughout the rest of the day.

== Aftermath ==
More than half of the American battalion was lost during its first engagement. Only 354 members of the battalion, including some walking wounded, were able to report for duty the next day. A captured North Korean soldier reported that around 100 men had been captured at Hadong. A later search uncovered 313 American bodies, most along the river and in the rice paddies south of the pass. Official casualties for the Americans in the battle were 242 killed, 135 wounded, 51 captured, and 67 missing, for a total of 495 casualties. However, two of the prisoners died in captivity and all but four of the missing were found dead, leaving the total number killed during the battle at 307. Over 30 vehicles and practically all of the soldiers' weapons used by 3rd Battalion were lost. Casualties of North Korean forces could not be estimated by the American units.

The shattered 3rd Battalion traveled back to Chinju to join the 19th Infantry Regiment. There it was disbanded and its remaining men were assigned to the 19th Infantry Regiment, which itself had suffered heavy losses. Meanwhile, the 1st Battalion, 29th Infantry was sent to Anui to the north, where it was attacked and pushed back repeatedly by the KPA 4th Division. On July 31, the KPA 6th Division struck Chinju, pushing back the 19th Infantry Regiment and the 3rd Battalion, 29th Infantry, forcing them to withdraw east. This left the southern entries to Pusan open, but the KPA 6th Division was unable to exploit it due to its extended supply line. The 6th Division eventually advanced further east, attempting to capture the city of Masan, but newly reorganized troops of the US Army repulsed them and inflicted heavy casualties on them less than a week later during the Battle of the Notch.
