= Chae Byong-duk =

South Korean general (1916–1950)

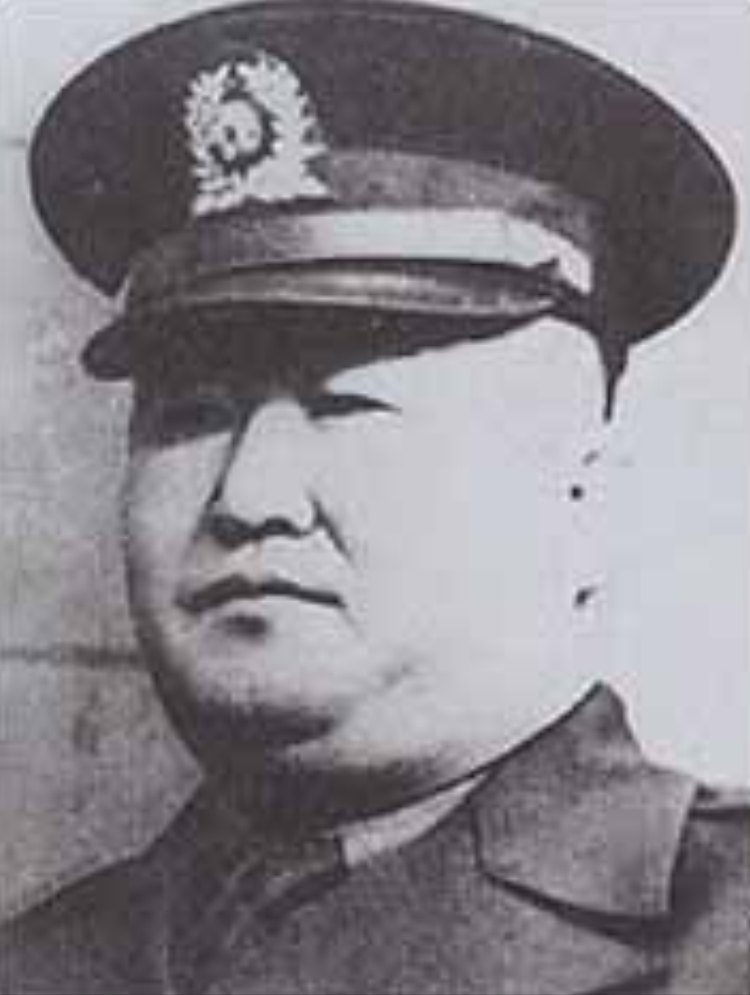

Personal details
- Born: 17 April 1916 Heian'nan-dō, Korea, Empire of Japan
- Died: 27 July 1950 (aged 34) Hadong, South Korea
- Education: Imperial Japanese Army Academy

Military service
- Allegiance: Empire of Japan (1933–1945); South Korea (1948–1950)
- Branch/service: Imperial Japanese Army (1933–1945); Republic of Korea Army (1948–1950)
- Years of service: 1933–1950
- Rank: Lieutenant General (Posthumously)
- Commands: Chief of Staff of the Republic of Korea Army (1949–1950); South Gyeongsang Province Defence Command (1950)
- Battles/wars: World War II; Korean War: Battle of Hadong †

Chae Byong-duk (Korean: 채병덕; Hanja: 蔡秉德; 17 April 1916 – 27 July 1950) was a South Korean army general.

== Early life ==
On 17 April 1916, he was born in Heian'nan-dō, Korea, Empire of Japan (now South Pyongan Province, North Korea). In 1933, he entered the Imperial Japanese Army Academy.

== Military career ==
During World War II, he served as an officer in the Imperial Japanese Army.

After the liberation of Korea, he joined the Republic of Korea Army.

He was prominent and active personal during the tension between two Koreas.

In April 1950, he started a second term as a Chief of Staff (Rank: Major general).

Following the outbreak of the Korean War, the Republic of Korea Army collapsed rapidly.

On 30 June 1950, Chae Byong-duk was dismissed and he transferred to South Gyeongsang Province Defence Command.

On 27 July, he was killed in action in the Battle of Hadong.

He was posthumously promoted to Lieutenant General after his death by the South Korean government.

== Awards and decorations ==
- Eulji Order of Military Merit (1952-05-20)
- Chungmu Order of Military Merit (1950-12-30)

== Legacy ==
He is the only South Korean Army General who was in killed in action during the Korean War. (There are some South Korean Army and Air Force Generals who were killed by accident and during the Korean War.)

There is a memorial in Hadong County.
