= Jeong Gongchae =

South Korean poet (1934–2008)

Jeong Gongchae (Korean: 정공채; Hanja: 鄭孔采; December 22, 1934 – April 30, 2008) was a South Korean contemporary poet.

== Biography ==
Jeong Gongchae was born in Hadong County, South Gyeongsang Province, in 1934. He studied Political Science at Yonsei University, and made his literary debut in the magazine Hyundae Munhak with three poems: "Jong-i unda" (종이 운다), "Yeojin" (여진), and "Haneul-gwa adeul" (하늘과 아들).

== Career ==
=== Notable events ===
- 1957 Debuted in Hyundae Munhak
- 1963 Published the poem "Mi 8-gun-ui cha" (미 8군의 차)
- 1979 Published the poetry collection Do You Have a Poetry Collection by Jeong Gongchae? (정공채 시집 있읍니까)
- 1981 Published the poetry collection Haejeom (해점)
- 1986 Published the poetry collection Arirang (아리랑)
- 1986 Published the poetry collection Let's Get Wet in the Rain (비에 젖읍시다)
- 1986 Published the poetry collection A Critical Biography of Jeon Hye-rin (전혜린 평전)
- 1989 Published the poetry collection Aesop's Fables (이솝 우화)
- 1989 Published the poetry collection The Sounds of People (사람소리)
- 1990 Published the poetry collection Writing on the Ground (땅에 글을 쓰다)
- 2000 Published the poetry collection New Excellence (새로운 우수)

=== Awards ===
- 1959 5th Contemporary Literature (Hyundae Munhak) Award - for "Coal" (石炭) and "Freedom" (自由)
- 1981 1st Korean Literature Association Award
- 2004 41st Korean Literature Award

== Works ==
- Do You Have a Poetry Collection by Jeong Gongchae? (정공채 시집 있읍니까, 1979)
- Haejeom (해점, 1981)
- Arirang (아리랑, 1986)
- Let's Get Wet in the Rain (비에 젖읍시다, 1986)
- A Critical Biography of Jeon Hye-rin (전혜린 평전, 1986)
- Aesop's Fables (이솝 우화, 1989)
- The Sounds of People (사람소리, 1989)
- From Your Morning to My Evening: An Essay Collection (너의 아침에서 나의 저녁까지, 1989)
- Writing on the Ground (땅에 글을 쓰다, 1990)
- New Excellence (새로운 우수, 2000)

== Family ==
- Jeong Dusu (younger brother) - lyricist and poet
