= Lee Hui-seong =

South Korean military officer (1924–2022)

Minister of Transport
- In office 21 May 1982 – 15 October 1983
- Preceded by: Yoon Ja-jung
- Succeeded by: Son Soo-ik

Chief of Staff of the Republic of Korea Army
- In office 13 December 1979 – 15 December 1981
- Preceded by: Jeong Seung-hwa
- Succeeded by: Hwang Young-si

Director of the Central Intelligence Agency of South Korea
- In office 30 October 1979 – 12 December 1979
- Preceded by: Yoon Il-gyun
- Succeeded by: Yoon Il-gyun

Personal details
- Born: 29 December 1924 Goseong County, Keishōnan Province, Korea, Empire of Japan
- Died: 6 June 2022 (aged 97)
- Party: Independent
- Education: Korea National Defense University
- Occupation: Military officer

Lee Hui-seong (Korean: 이희성; 29 December 1924 – 6 June 2022) was a South Korean military officer and politician. An independent, he served as Chief of Staff of the Republic of Korea Army from 1979 to 1981 and was Minister of Transport from 1982 to 1983.

He died on 6 June 2022, at the age of 97.
