= Chŏng Kiryong =

Korean general (1562–1622)

Duke Ch'ungŭi Chŏng Kiryong
- 정기룡
- Born: 24th day, 4th month of 1562; Konyang, Joseon
- Died: 28th day, 2nd month of 1622; Tongyeong, Joseon
- Cause of death: Killed in action
- Burial place: Sangju, South Korea
- Military career
- Allegiance: Joseon
- Conflicts: Imjin War

Korean name
- Hangul: 정기룡
- Hanja: 鄭起龍
- RR: Jeong Giryong
- MR: Chŏng Kiryong

Courtesy name
- Hangul: 경운
- Hanja: 景雲
- RR: Gyeongun
- MR: Kyŏngun

Posthumous name
- Hangul: 충의
- Hanja: 忠毅
- RR: Chungui
- MR: Ch'ungŭi

Chŏng Kiryong (Korean: 정기룡; Hanja: 鄭起龍; 1562–1622) was a prominent Korean general during the Joseon period. He fought against the 1592–1598 Japanese invasions of Korea, and won the battles of Geochang and Geumsan. He was one of those who recaptured the Sangju castle, captured the Japanese general in Goryeong, and recaptured Seongju, Hapcheon, Uiryeong, Gyeongju and Ulsan.

Chŏng Kiryong was born in Jinju, South Gyeongsang Province in 1562. His original name was Chŏng Musu (정무수; 鄭茂壽). He was the son of Chŏng Ho, Fourth State Councillor (Jwachanseong 좌찬성). In 1586, he passed the military examination and renamed Kiryong by the King's command.

In 1590, he got to serve as a drill instructor under the Sin Rip, Commander of the Right Gyeongsangdo. When the war broke in 1592, he got promoted to manager, starting to serve under the Cho Gyeong, Marshal of the Right Gyeongsangdo.

At that time, he has recommended to General Cho Kyŏng a scheme to check an advance of Japanese army, as a consequence of complying his artifice, they have destroyed 500 of Japanese army in a Battle of Geochang.

He has jumped in the Battle of Geumsan and saved Cho Kyŏng who was captured by Japanese army as a prisoner of war.

After then he defended against the Japanese armies' attack at Jeolla province as appointed as the Lord of Gonyang. In succession, after he was appointed the lord of Sangju which was lost by the Japanese army, he reseized that castle of Sangju by fighting with that Japanese army.

As soon as the second war broke out against the Japan in 1597, his Joseon army broke the Japanese army Goryeong and captured the chief of the Japanese army alive. In succession, he reseized many castles such as Seongju, Hapcheon, Chogye, Uiryeong, Kyungju and Ulsan and then was promoted to Commander of the Right Gyeongsangdo.

After he had led the Joseon-Ming combined forces in the year 1598, he swept the remnants of the defeated Japanese army in the areas of Gyeongsang provinces.

General Chŏng kept staying in Gyeongsang provinces and prepared to prevent the reinvasion of the Japan, though the war against the Japan ended in the year 1601.

He was promoted as a field marshal (Sanghogun 상호군) in 1610, and after that as an admiral of the fleet he undertook the naval commander of the Three Provinces (Samdo Sugun Tongjesa 삼도수군통제사) and died in camp of Tongyeong in 1622.
