= Walter Leo Weible =

U.S. Army general (1896–1980)

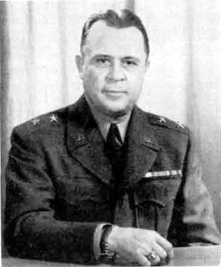
- Weible as commander of the Japan Logistical Command, 1951.
- Born: June 2, 1896; Waterbury, Connecticut, United States
- Died: February 19, 1980 (aged 83); Rockville, Maryland, United States
- Military career
- Allegiance: United States
- Branch: United States Army
- Service years: 1917–1957
- Rank: Lieutenant General
- Service number: 0-11308
- Unit: Coast Artillery Corps
- Commands: Headquarters and Service Group, Far East Command; Japan Logistical Command
- Conflicts: World War I World War II; Korean War
- Awards: Army Distinguished Service Medal; Legion of Merit; Bronze Star
- Other work: President and Executive Vice President, Association of the United States Army

Lieutenant General Walter Leo Weible (June 2, 1896 − February 19, 1980) was a United States Army officer who served in both World War I and World War II

== Early life ==
Weible was born on June 2, 1896, in Waterbury, Connecticut. He graduated from Pratt Institute in 1917 with a degree in engineering.

== World War I ==
Weible enlisted for World War I as a private in the Army Coast Artillery on December 17, 1917. He served on Long Island until June 25, 1918, when he received his commission as a second lieutenant in the Coast Artillery.

== Post-World War I ==
Weible served throughout the United States in the 1920s and 1930s. In 1927, he graduated from the Coast Artillery School. In 1928, Weible graduated from the Engineer Officer Advanced Course. Weible graduated from the Chemical Warfare Officer Course in 1928, afterwards carrying out an assignment at Fort Winfield Scott, where he remained until 1930. In 1930, Weible was transferred to Hawaii, and in 1931 he was assigned to Fort MacArthur, where he stayed until 1933. Weible then attended the Command & General Staff College, graduating in 1935. In 1938, Weible graduated from the Army War College, and in 1939 he graduated from the Army Industrial College.

== World War II ==
From 1942 to 1943, Weible was deputy director of Military Training for the Army Service Forces. In 1943, he was appointed as Director, receiving promotion to major general, and serving until 1945.

== Post-World War II ==
General Weible served during the occupation of Japan as commander of Headquarters and Service Group, the logistical and administrative unit of the Far East Command.

== Korean War ==
In 1950, Weible was appointed commander of the Japan Logistical Command (JLC), based in Yokohama. The JLC was responsible for supporting fighting units in Korea by pre-ordering supplies and equipment from the United States, and then maintaining stockpiles in Japan for rapid transport into the combat theater.

== Post-Korean War ==
Weible was named Deputy Commander of the 5th United States Army in 1953 and was promoted to lieutenant general.

Later in 1953, Weible was named the Army's Deputy Chief of Staff for Operations & Administration.

In 1956, a reorganization of the roles and responsibilities of the Army staff resulted in Weible's appointment as Deputy Chief of Staff for Personnel, where he remained until his 1957 retirement.

== McCarthy hearings controversy ==
During the McCarthy hearings of 1954 and 1955, Senator McCarthy objected to the Army's decision to promote dentist Irving Peress to major on the grounds that he was a security risk. Peress subsequently received an honorable discharge, despite McCarthy's call for a court-martial. General Weible later testified that he was responsible for approving the honorable discharge for Peress, determining that McCarthy's request was not sufficient reason to deny it. Weible also testified that he might have made a different determination if information about Peress later revealed by McCarthy had been known to him at the time.

== Awards and decorations ==
General Weible's decorations included multiple awards of the Distinguished Service Medal, including two for World War II, the Legion of Merit, and the Bronze Star.

== Civilian career ==
Weible had served as president of the Association of the United States Army in the mid-1950s, while it was still an unofficial organization. After retiring from the Army Weible was employed as AUSA's Executive Vice President.

== Retirement and death ==
In retirement General Weible lived in Montgomery County, Maryland. He died in Rockville, Maryland on February 19, 1980. He was buried at Arlington National Cemetery, Section 11 Lot 233–1.

== Other ==
In 1955 Weible received an honorary doctor of laws degree from Pratt Institute.

The Walter L. Weible Papers are stored at the U.S. Army's Military History Institute.
