= Tonghua Incident =

1946 armed uprising in Tonghua, China

- Part of Regional surrender ceremonies in the China Theater of World War II
Date	3 February 1946
Location	Tonghua, Andong Province, China
Result	Victory of the Northeast Democratic Allied Army

Belligerents
Northeast Democratic Allied Army: Tonghua Detachment; Korean Volunteer Army; 1st Detachment; 1st Company; 3rd Company; 5th Company	Tonghua Municipal Party Headquarters of the Kuomintang (Japan) Remnants of the Kwantung Army (including elements of the 125th Division)

Commanders and leaders
Liu Xiyuan	Sun Gengyao (executed) (Japan) Fujita Jitsuhiko (died of illness after arrest)

Strength
More than 1,000 Chinese and Korean troops	Over 10,000 Japanese (including remnants of the Kwantung Army); Kuomintang agents and affiliated armed elements

Casualties and losses
Over 150 wounded killed; 26 soldiers killed in action	Over 1,000 Japanese killed; Over 3,000 Japanese captured

The Tonghua Incident (Chinese: 通化事件), also known as the February 3 Incident in Tonghua (Chinese: 通化二·三事件) or the Tonghua 3 February Riot (Chinese: 通化二·三反革命暴乱) was an armed uprising that broke out in Tonghua on 3 February 1946. It occurred during the post–World War II transition period when Nationalist and Chinese Communist Party forces were competing to take control of formerly Japanese-occupied territories following the surrender of Japan.

According to contemporary Chinese sources, the uprising was organized by Kuomintang agent Sun Gengyao, who gathered former collaborators and remnants of the Japanese Kwantung Army led by Fujita Jitsuhiko in an attempt to seize control of Tonghua from Communist authorities. The conspirators established multiple command posts in the city, recruited Japanese residents through coercion and publicity, and planted informants within hospitals and local government offices.

On 2 February 1946, the plot was uncovered by the local People’s Government and the Northeast Democratic Allied Army. The main command center was raided and key leaders, including Sun Gengyao (Chinese: 孙耕尧), were arrested. With the scheduled start of the uprising only hours away, several principal conspirators were executed after interrogation.

At approximately 4:00 a.m. on 3 February, armed participants launched coordinated attacks on major government, military, and communications installations in Tonghua. Some buildings, including the Public Security Bureau, were briefly seized. After roughly two hours of fighting, Communist forces suppressed the uprising. Subsequent searches throughout the city led to the capture of additional participants, including Fujita Jitsuhiko (藤田実彦).

== Background ==
Following Japan’s surrender on 15 August 1945, the former puppet state of Manchukuo collapsed, leaving a power vacuum in many northeastern cities, including Tonghua. In the months that followed, three principal forces emerged in the area: Communist-led forces, Nationalist (Kuomintang) organizations, and large numbers of remaining Japanese military personnel and civilians.

=== Communist forces ===
In the immediate aftermath of Japan’s surrender, local Communist activists organized self-defense units in and around Tonghua. By September 1945, these forces had taken over former puppet administrative bodies and established new local governments under the control of the Chinese Communist Party (CCP).

Units of the Northeast Democratic Allied Army were stationed in the city, and the Tonghua Detachment was formed under the Liaodong Military District. The Korean Volunteer Army also deployed forces in the region. In late 1945, military training institutions, including aviation and artillery schools, began preparations in Tonghua.

=== Kuomintang organizations ===
Several Kuomintang county party headquarters were established in Tonghua after Japan’s surrender. These included organizations formed by Nationalist agents and former collaborators. Some of these groups organized armed units under various titles and engaged in political agitation and sabotage, aiming to secure Tonghua for the Nationalist government.

Internal rivalries existed among these Nationalist-affiliated groups, but their broader objective was to undermine Communist control in preparation for a Nationalist takeover.

=== Japanese population and military remnants ===
At the end of 1945, more than 16,000 Japanese civilians remained in Tonghua. In addition, substantial numbers of former Kwantung Army personnel, including elements of the 125th Division, were dispersed in the surrounding region. Some concealed their identities or posed as civilians.

While many Japanese civilians cooperated with local authorities and organized themselves into associations under Communist supervision, Chinese sources state that certain former military officers and agents formed clandestine groups and engaged in acts of sabotage, including assassinations and bombings.

== Eve of the Incident ==
On 20 November 1945, Fujita Jitsuhiko was recommended to Mo Dehui—commander of the Kuomintang Northeast Southern Advance Army—by Ikeda Sumihisa, who had defected to the Kuomintang. Mo promptly appointed Fujita as the "Commander of the Tonghua Forward Area," tasking him with gathering the remaining Japanese troops in the Tonghua region to oppose the People’s forces and facilitate the Nationalist takeover of Tonghua. Shortly thereafter, Fujita established contact with Sun Gengyao. The two met on 15 December. Sun assured Fujita that the Japanese in Tonghua would not be repatriated and would not lose their employment; Fujita, in turn, demanded that a Sino-Japanese joint government be established in Tonghua after the plan succeeded. Both sides accepted the other’s conditions and began making concrete plans for an uprising. Fujita at one point attempted to win over Japanese leaders within the Japanese Repatriation Association (Nichigekiren), but was soon arrested by the People’s Government. Having detected irregularities, the People’s Government launched a citywide search in Tonghua and surrounding areas for concealed Japanese officers. By January 1946, more than one hundred Japanese officers had been arrested, including over 120 with the rank of captain or above.

On 13 January 1946, with assistance from Japanese collaborators, Fujita escaped from the third floor of the Tonghua Detachment headquarters while his guards were asleep, injuring his ankle in the process. On 15 January, under the direction of former Japanese puppet agent Liu Zhengxiu, who had arrived from Shenyang, Sun Gengyao, Fujita Jitsuhiko, and others convened a secret meeting at Sun’s residence. They established the so-called "Provisional Eastern Border Region Military-Political Committee," with Sun as chair and Fujita and others as members, and created subordinate bodies including political, military, and finance departments. The "committee" initially planned to launch the uprising on 17 January, but the plan fell through due to a lack of outside support. On 18 January, Liu Zhengxiu returned to Shenyang. Thereafter, Fujita established contact with the Liaoning Provincial Party Headquarters of the Kuomintang in Shenyang and received special attention from its Executive Committee chair, Li Guangchen. From that point forward, Fujita intensified preparations for the uprising.

On 22 January, Fujita Jitsuhiko and Sun Gengyao established the so-called "Armed Uprising Command Headquarters" at the home of agent Liu Jingru on South Cross West Street (Yongyou Oil Mill). The "headquarters" created three sub-command posts. The first was located near the Tonghua Catholic Church; the second was at the residence of agent Jiang Jilong on Yumin Street; and the third was at the residence of agent Chi Wenyu in Tonghua’s Nanguan District. Each command post was staffed with designated commanders. Subsequently, Japanese agents including Kondō Haruo dispatched nine liaison teams to areas such as the Changbai Mountains to gather remaining elements of the Kwantung Army. They also began recruiting collaborators, former puppet troops and police officers, as well as local thugs within the city.

The total number of remaining Japanese personnel reportedly planned to participate reached 30,000, including more than 3,000 within the city—primarily disarmed remnants of the Kwantung Army—and large numbers concealed in areas such as the Changbai Mountains outside the city. In addition, nearly 20,000 Kuomintang members and bandits were said to be involved. Most weapons consisted of knives and clubs, while insiders supplied a limited number of rifles and pistols.

The uprising was scheduled for the early morning of 3 February (Chinese New Year). Primary targets included the Tonghua Administrative Inspector’s Office, the Tonghua Detachment Headquarters, the Tonghua Municipal People’s Government, the Tonghua County People’s Government, the Tonghua County Brigade, the Tonghua Municipal Public Security Bureau, the Tonghua Telegraph Office, the Tonghua Electric Power Bureau, the Tonghua Radio Station, the Tonghua Daily newspaper office, Tonghua First Hospital, the Northeast Mint, and the Northeast Artillery School and Northeast Aviation School affiliated with the Northeast Military and Political University. The signal to launch the uprising was to be three consecutive citywide power outages; after the third blackout, power would not be restored. In suburban areas, the signal would be beacon fires lit atop Yuhuang Mountain. Other planned identifying signals included aircraft displaying red cloth strips, tanks flying triangular flags marked "Provisional Northeast Region Forces," and three blasts of steam whistles. According to the plan, insurgents would shine flashlights in three circles toward buildings housing insiders, who would respond by waving white towels three times.

The insurgents’ activities gradually came to the attention of the People’s Government. By the afternoon of 2 February, Liu Zizhou, who was responsible for the second command post, attempted to persuade Shen Diankai—the section chief of supplies in the Logistics Ordnance Department of the Liaodong Military District—to defect. Shen was lured to the "General Headquarters" and subjected to threats and inducements. He feigned agreement, obtained partial information about internal collaborators, and soon excused himself under the pretext of retrieving his weapon from his office, thereby escaping control. He immediately reported the situation to Ordnance Minister Wu Yunqing, who in turn informed Liu Xiyuan, commander and political commissar of the Tonghua Detachment, and arranged for Shen to report in person at headquarters.

At the same time, Tonghua Deputy Mayor Dong Bin (Chinese: 董滨) and Tonghua Detachment Chief of Staff Ru Fuyi (Chinese: 茹夫一) also received reports. The information conveyed to Dong Bin came from county brigade clerk Guan Siyu, who had previously been abducted by infiltrated Kuomintang agents. The information provided to Ru Fuyi was delivered by his communications officer Li (a Tonghua native and former student of Sun Gengyao who had also previously been abducted by Nationalist agents). In addition, soldiers of the Korean Volunteer Army’s South Manchuria Detachment discovered individuals wearing uprising armbands while patrolling the streets, arrested them, and learned details of the plot during interrogation.

After assessing the situation, the People’s Government and military authorities determined that the only People’s forces stationed in the city were the 2nd and 5th Companies of the 1st Battalion of the Korean Volunteer Army’s South Manchuria Detachment, along with the People’s Government Guard Company, totaling just over 500 personnel. Preliminary information indicated that at least 600 Japanese insiders were concealed within various departments. The authorities therefore contacted other units engaged in bandit-suppression operations to return for reinforcement, while simultaneously dispatching a platoon to arrest or place under house arrest suspected collaborators and seize weapons under their control.

At 10:00 p.m. that night, the military subdistrict telegraphed the aviation corps, reporting that a Japanese pilot intended to fly an aircraft in support of the uprising; the corps security section promptly arrested the pilot. Meanwhile, Japanese insurgents infiltrated a People’s Army garrison in an attempt to remove a tank. Tank driver Gao Ke noticed the engine noise and, together with several soldiers, subdued the infiltrators. From them, he learned that five Japanese POWs capable of operating tanks intended to participate in the uprising; these five were soon brought under control.

During the arrests of collaborators, authorities discovered that Guan Enji, secretary to Tonghua Mayor and Municipal Party Secretary Fan Pengfei, was the head of an assassination squad affiliated with the Three People’s Principles Youth League; multiple insiders were also found within the Guard Company. On the evening of 2 February, three collaborators attempted to abduct Fan Pengfei but were shot dead on the spot by soldiers carrying out the arrests. By the time Sun and others had confessed the details of the uprising, it was already 1:00 a.m. on 3 February—less than three hours before the scheduled launch. The Tonghua Sub-provincial Committee leadership therefore ordered the immediate execution of seven principal offenders, including Sun Gengyao, Zheng Naiqiao, and Liu Jingru, in order to cripple the uprising’s command system. Troops were then deployed to guard key positions and prepare to suppress the revolt. The counterinsurgency command headquarters was established in the administrative building at the foot of Yuhuang Mountain.

== Course of Events ==
At approximately 4:00 a.m. on February 3, rioters seized control of the power bureau substation. The city’s electrical lights were switched off three times and turned back on twice, serving as the prearranged signal to launch the rebellion. Large numbers of Japanese rioters then surged toward the Tonghua Detachment headquarters. Ru Fuyi, who was responsible for the defense, executed several internal collaborators before personally directing the battle and repelling multiple enemy assaults. In this exchange of fire, more than 200 Japanese rioters were killed, while the detachment’s deputy squad leader and several soldiers were killed in action.

The garrison of the Korean Volunteer Army detachment was also attacked. In an attempt to create panic among the defenders, the rioters set fire to a pile of firewood near the main gate. Taking advantage of the firelight, the Volunteer Army soldiers defending the compound eliminated the first wave of attackers who rushed inside. However, the rioters eventually forced the defenders back into the main building with grenades. Reinforcements soon arrived, and the Volunteer Army drove all the rioters out.

At Tonghua First Hospital, which had previously been taken over by the People’s authorities, Japanese rioters mobilized Japanese doctors and nurses within the hospital. Using scalpels and surgical scissors, they killed more than 150 wounded People’s Army soldiers who were receiving treatment. Several Chinese hospital staff members were killed while resisting. A small number of staff members fought back tenaciously, while others broke through the encirclement to guide returning Korean Volunteer Army reinforcements back to the hospital. After intense fighting, more than 50 wounded soldiers were rescued. Over 30 Japanese rioters were captured, more than 30 escaped, and the remainder were killed.

In the direction of the Administrative Inspector’s Office building, the rioters—composed mainly of Japanese nationals and Kuomintang bandits—briefly stormed from the first-floor lobby to the second floor with the assistance of internal collaborators. The guard unit defending the building responded with machine-gun fire and grenades, and hand-to-hand combat ensued. Ultimately, with the support of returning bandit-suppression forces and the Korean Volunteer Army, all enemy forces were eliminated. Aside from several dozen captured alive, the remaining rioters were killed.

In the detention compound near the Administrative Inspector’s Office, more than 120 captured officers of the Kwantung Army were being held. When rioters attacked the facility, only a single squad was on guard duty. Seeing the situation, the squad leader ordered the immediate execution of all detained Japanese officers before continuing defensive operations. The guards ultimately held out until reinforcements arrived. Japanese rioters also assaulted the municipal and county government offices. Two light machine guns positioned at the entrance of the aviation corps headquarters bore the brunt of the defensive effort. However, when the rioters discovered that their internal collaborators had failed to coordinate as planned and that defenders were returning fire, they quickly dispersed. Guan Enji, whose identity had already been confirmed but who had not yet been arrested, was subsequently taken into custody. The Artillery School was likewise attacked but ultimately repelled the assault.

The Public Security Bureau building was at one point seized by the rioters, forcing defending personnel to withdraw. The rioters stormed inside, attempting to release former puppet imperial household personnel who had been detained there, including the former Manchukuo imperial consort Hiro Saga and the former empress Wanrong, along with other members of the puppet Imperial Household Department. They also seized weapons stored inside the building.

The Telegraph Office compound adjacent to the Public Security Bureau was also repeatedly attacked. People’s Army soldiers withdrew into the building and returned fire. Reinforcements from the 5th Company, 1st Battalion of the Korean Volunteer Army’s South Manchuria Detachment engaged the rioters in close combat in front of the Public Security Bureau building and drove them away, only to be pinned down by gunfire from rioters still inside the structure.

Additional reinforcements from the Tonghua Detachment soon arrived and cleared rioters from around the exterior of the building. The People’s forces initially attempted to persuade those inside to surrender, but the rioters responded by throwing grenades from the windows and continued resisting. Shen Chang, a staff officer from the Artillery School who had come to assist, and soldier Li Tang were severely wounded in a grenade blast and later died of their injuries. The Artillery School then deployed artillery and opened fire on the building. After three shells were fired, the remaining rioters inside surrendered.

Two hours after the outbreak of the rebellion, dawn was breaking. People’s Army soldiers assigned to pursuit operations, joined by several hundred Chinese civilians armed with clubs and iron picks, began hunting down rioters fleeing throughout the city. Some Japanese rioters who fled into an air-raid shelter near the Administrative Inspector’s Office refused to surrender and were subsequently all killed by People’s forces. Outside Tonghua, large numbers of Kuomintang puppet police and local puppet armed units had originally planned to participate in the uprising. However, upon realizing that the situation inside the city had turned against the rioters, they fled without joining the rebellion.

== Aftermath ==
On the evening of February 2, the Aviation Corps Security Section interrogated a detained Japanese pilot suspected of involvement in the uprising. At first, the pilot refused to provide any information. At 3:50 a.m. on February 3, however, he claimed that one of the principal ringleaders of the rebellion was the Aviation Corps’ Japanese chief flight instructor, Hayashi Yaichirō. Subsequent investigation revealed that this accusation was supported by no evidence beyond the pilot’s single statement. After the rebellion was suppressed, no responsibility was pursued against Hayashi Yaichirō on this basis, and he was allowed to continue serving as chief flight instructor. Hayashi reportedly expressed considerable gratitude for this decision.

After order was restored, the People’s Government and military authorities declared citywide martial law and launched an intensive manhunt for escaped rioters. On February 3, some Japanese participants in the uprising were captured while attempting to flee toward Shenyang and Andong. On February 4, the Korean Volunteer Army discovered Fujita Jitsuhiko, Kondō Haruo, and 29 others hiding in a concealed space above the ceiling of a Japanese residence.

Among Kuomintang operatives, a small number—including Jiang Jilong and Chi Wenyu—escaped back to Shenyang. The remaining dozen or so members of the Three People’s Principles Youth League underground working group were arrested. By February 5, more than 1,000 rioters had been detained in total, including over 100 Kuomintang agents. Large quantities of light machine guns, rifles, pistols, and grenades were seized, along with substantial funds. During the suppression of the rebellion, more than 1,000 rioters were killed on the spot. Twenty-six People’s soldiers were killed in action, while no additional casualties were sustained during subsequent pursuit operations. The bodies of the Japanese rioters who were killed were ultimately dragged onto the frozen surface of the Hun River. Holes were cut through the ice, and the bodies were pushed into the river. Their clothing and gold teeth were stripped by enraged civilians.

Because of their large numbers, detained Japanese rioters were held in multiple locations, including the Tonghua Detachment headquarters, the Aviation Corps compound, the Administrative Inspector’s Office air-raid shelter, and the municipal government building. Kuomintang detainees were held at the Administrative Inspector’s Office Public Security Department. After more than a month of interrogation, authorities identified more than 80 remaining Japanese field-grade officers from the former Kwantung Army, over a dozen principal Japanese ringleaders of the uprising including Fujita Jitsuhiko, multiple Japanese agents affiliated with the Kuomintang’s Northeast Headquarters, and several Kuomintang agents who had intended to assume control of Tonghua following the rebellion. With the exception of Fujita Jitsuhiko and a few others, these principal offenders were executed.

More than 130 Chinese nationals who had been coerced into participating in the residual unrest, along with 893 Japanese detainees, were released after undergoing reeducation. Following the conclusion of the interrogations, an exhibition of evidence related to the uprising was held in the Fenghou Commercial Building on Dingzi Street in Tonghua. The exhibition publicly displayed confiscated rebellion plans, coded messages, proclamations, photographs of the principal offenders, and weapons used in the uprising. Major suspects such as Fujita Jitsuhiko were brought to the exhibition site to be publicly displayed and to confess their crimes.

Members of the Kuomintang Military Mediation Office’s 29th Team, who had come to observe military conditions, also visited the exhibition under the escort of Zhang Xuesi. On March 14, Fujita Jitsuhiko died of illness in the hospital.

== Impact ==
After the rebellion was suppressed, Zhu Rui, then commander of the Tonghua Military Subdistrict, presented a brass gold-plated pocket watch—captured during the fighting—to tank driver Gao Ke in recognition of his actions. On December 27, 1985, Gao Ke donated the pocket watch, which he had carried with him for several decades, to the Northeast Martyrs Memorial Hall.

On February 17, a memorial service for the fallen martyrs was held in the courtyard of the Administrative Inspector’s Office. On March 8, Wu Gaizhi gave an interview to a reporter from the Tonghua Daily, recounting the course of the suppression of the rebellion and discussing what he described as the essential role played by Japanese elements and Kuomintang agents in instigating the unrest.

On the Japanese side, in 1952 Nakayama Kikumatsu—who had led participants in the assault on the Public Security Bureau during the uprising—established the Tonghua Bereaved Families Association (通化遺族会). Beginning in 1955, an annual memorial service was held on February 3 at Yasukuni Shrine.

Starting in 1954, Japan’s Minister of Health and Welfare approved related compensation measures, under which “bereavement pensions” were issued to the families of former Kwantung Army officers and soldiers who had been killed during the Tonghua incident.

== See also ==
- Outline of the Chinese Civil War
- Nanjing Massacre
- Liaoyuan Miners' Mass Grave
- Panjiayu Massacre
