= Hadong County =

County in South Gyeongsang Province, South Korea

Coordinates: 35°04′N 127°45′E

Hadong
- County
- Panoramic view of Hadong

- Flag Emblem of Hadong

- Location in South Korea
- Country: South Korea
- Region: Yeongnam
- Administrative divisions: 1 eup, 12 myeon

Area
  - Total: 675.53 km^{2} (260.82 sq mi)

Population (September 2024)
  - Total: 40,909
  - Density: 85.9/km^{2} (222/sq mi)
  - Dialect: Gyeongsang
- Website: https://www.hadong.go.kr

Korean name
- Hangul: 하동군
- Hanja: 河東郡
- RR: Hadong-gun
- MR: Hadong-gun

Hadong County (Korean: 하동군) is a county in South Gyeongsang Province, South Korea. It is located on the far-west side of the province, bordering South Jeolla Province. The county office is located at Hadeong-eup.

== History ==
Hadong was originally called Dasachon (다사촌; 大沙县, "county of much sand") when it was a part of the Jin state. It later became part of Nangnoguk (낙노국; 樂奴國), one of the Byeonhan confederacy's twelve statelets. According to the History of the Three Kingdoms, the region was called Handasa-gun (한다사군) before changing into Hadong-gun in 757 CE during the reign of King Gyeongdeok of Silla. During the Goryeo dynasty, the area was known as Hadong-hyeon (하동현). Amid the reign of the Joseon-era King Taejong in 1414, it became known as Hanamhyeon (하남현) with Namhaehyeon (남해현). In 1702, Agyang-myeon was added to Hadong-gun. Hadong was raised to the status of Hadongdohobu (하동도호부) in 1740, the thirtieth year of King Sukjong's reign.

On April 1, 1914, Seo-myeon (서면) and Geumyang-myeon (금양면) were added to Hadong. Part of Seomjin-ri (섬진리), Daap-myeon (다압면), and Gwangyang-gun of South Jeolla Province were added to Hadong on January 1, 1915. In 1917, Naehoengbo-myeon (내횡보면) was renamed to Hoengcheon-myeon (횡천면) while Deokyang-myeon (덕양면) was renamed to Jingyo-myeon (진교면). Geumyang-myeon (금양면) was abolished and incorporated into Jingyo-myeon (진교면) and Geumnam-myeon (금남면), formerly Nam-myeon (남면), on January 1, 1933. On October 1, 1938, Hadong-myeon (하동면) was elevated to Hadong-eup (하동읍).

During the Korean War, the region was the site of the Hadong Ambush, a North Korean attack on US Army forces.

== Local sights and attractions ==
Nestled between the Seomjin River and Mount Jiri, the county is a popular destination for both domestic and foreign tourists who enjoy nature. Portions of the Jirisan National Park lie within the county, forming the county's hilly, mountainous landscape.

The Ssanggyesa is a historic Korean Buddhist temple of the Jogye Order that has been designated a National Treasure.

Pak Gyeongni's 16-volume novel Land is partially set in the village of Pyeongsa-ri (평사리) in Agyang-myeon, Hadong County. A replica of the fictional Choi family's home was built there to commemorate the author's legacy.

=== Green tea ===
Hadong has been famous for its green tea since the Silla era when an envoy brought green tea seeds from the Tang Empire to be planted locally. The local government has long promoted this as a major local attraction, including sponsoring a tourism advertisement that aired on CNN in 2007. The annual "wild tea" festival, lasting 25 days, takes place during May and June.

== Development ==
While much of South Korea has experienced rapid industrial development, Hadong remains a destination for those wishing to escape the bustle of city living. However, a lack of industrial sector activity has left the government with little incentive to expand the sometimes inadequate existing road infrastructure. A petition for the allocation of funds for new road construction was signed by a number of Hadong residents.

Former South Korean president Lee Myung-bak has recently announced plans for the construction of a Gyeongsangnam-do leisure resort palace in Hadong.

== Notable people ==
- Jeong Gi-ryong
- Yi Byeong-ju, a novelist, journalist, and reporter
- Jeong Ho-seung
- Kang Man-soo
- Jeong Gongchae, a poet who won the 1960 Contemporary Literature (Hyundae Munhak) Award

== Schools ==
- Agyang Middle School

== Twin towns – sister cities ==
Hadong is twinned with:

- Anyang, South Korea
- Gwangyang, South Korea
- Geoje, South Korea
- Seongdong-gu, South Korea
- Haeundae-gu, South Korea
- Zhangqiu, China
- Ya'an, China
- Zhangjiajie, China
- (United States) Adelanto, California
