= 6th Division (North Korea) =

6th Infantry Division
- Active: 1949-present
- Country: North Korea
- Allegiance: Korean People's Army
- Branch: Korean People's Army Ground Force
- Type: Division
- Role: Infantry
- Engagements: Korean War

The 6th Infantry Division is a military formation of the Korean People's Army Ground Force.

== KPA ==
The date that the 6th Infantry Division was formed in somewhat unclear. During the Korean War, the Army believed it was established either in July 1949 or March 1950. It is believed the division was formed at Sinuiju from 10,000 Chinese Communist Army personnel of Korean descent from the 166th Division, who had been "repatriated" in late 1949 together with the former 1st Regiment of the 1st Division. The Korea Institute of Military History indicates that the division was established in October 1949. All sources indicate that the unit was initially composed of the 13th Infantry Regiment, 14th and 15th Infantry Regiments, and the 6th Artillery Regiment.

The 6th Infantry Division took part in the opening moves of the North Korean invasion of South Korea, moving against the ROKA 1st Division on June 25, 1950. After suffering heavy casualties in the Inchon area, this division met no opposition in its move down the west coast. Despite heavy casualties in its attempts to take Masan, the units morale and combat effectiveness were still considered good. It was part of the North Korean advance from Seoul to Taejon and fought in the Battle of Pusan Perimeter.
