= Field artillery =

Artillery piece designed to deploy with army units in the field

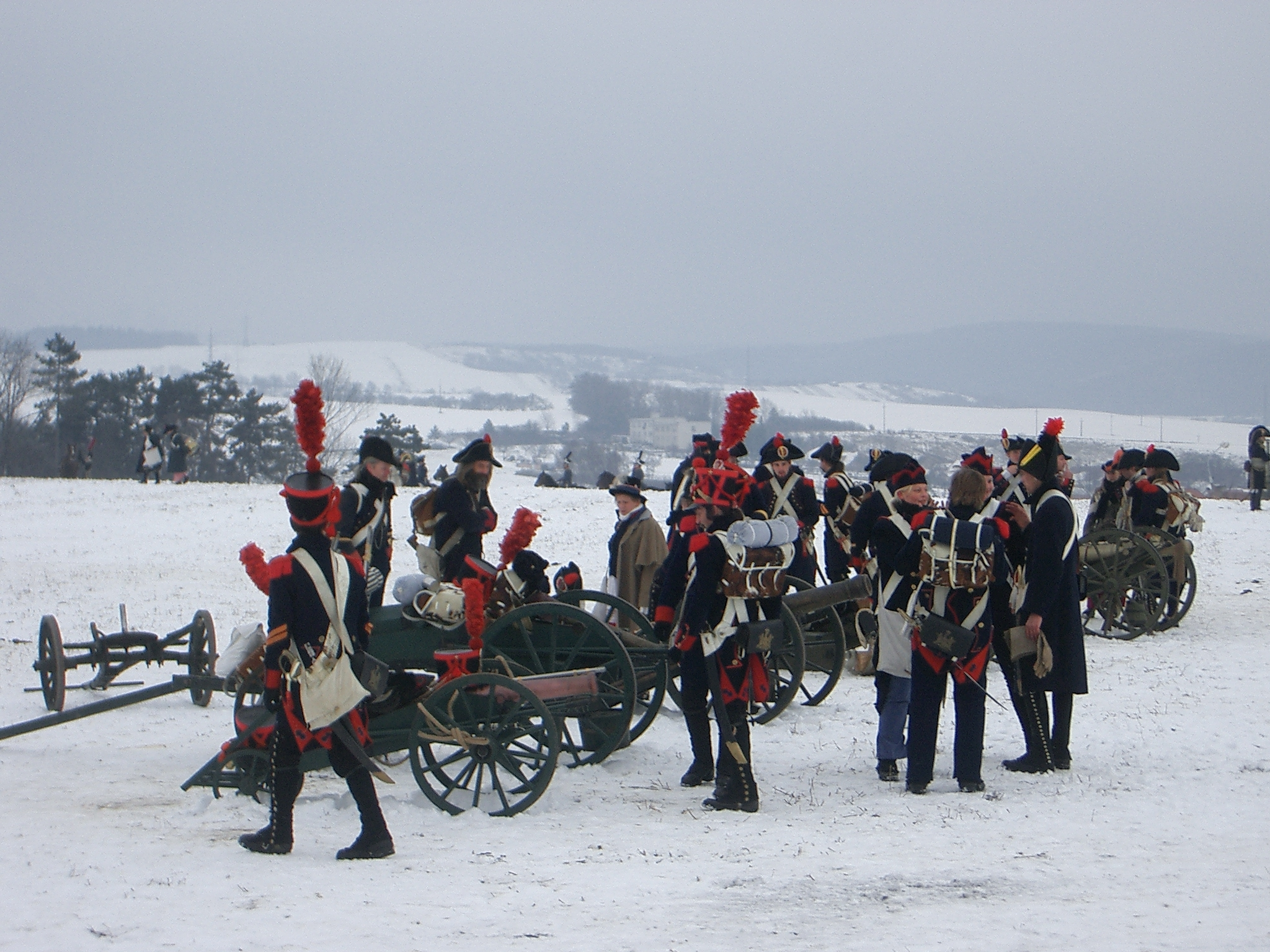
French Napoleonic artillery battery. Photo taken during the 200th anniversary reenactment of the battle of Austerlitz in 1805.

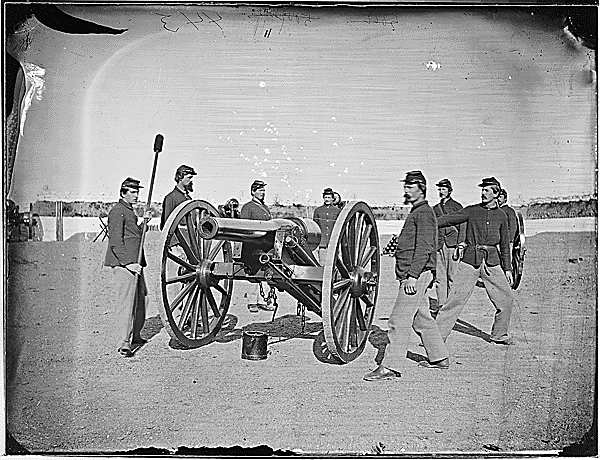
US Army gun squad at drill, c. 1860.

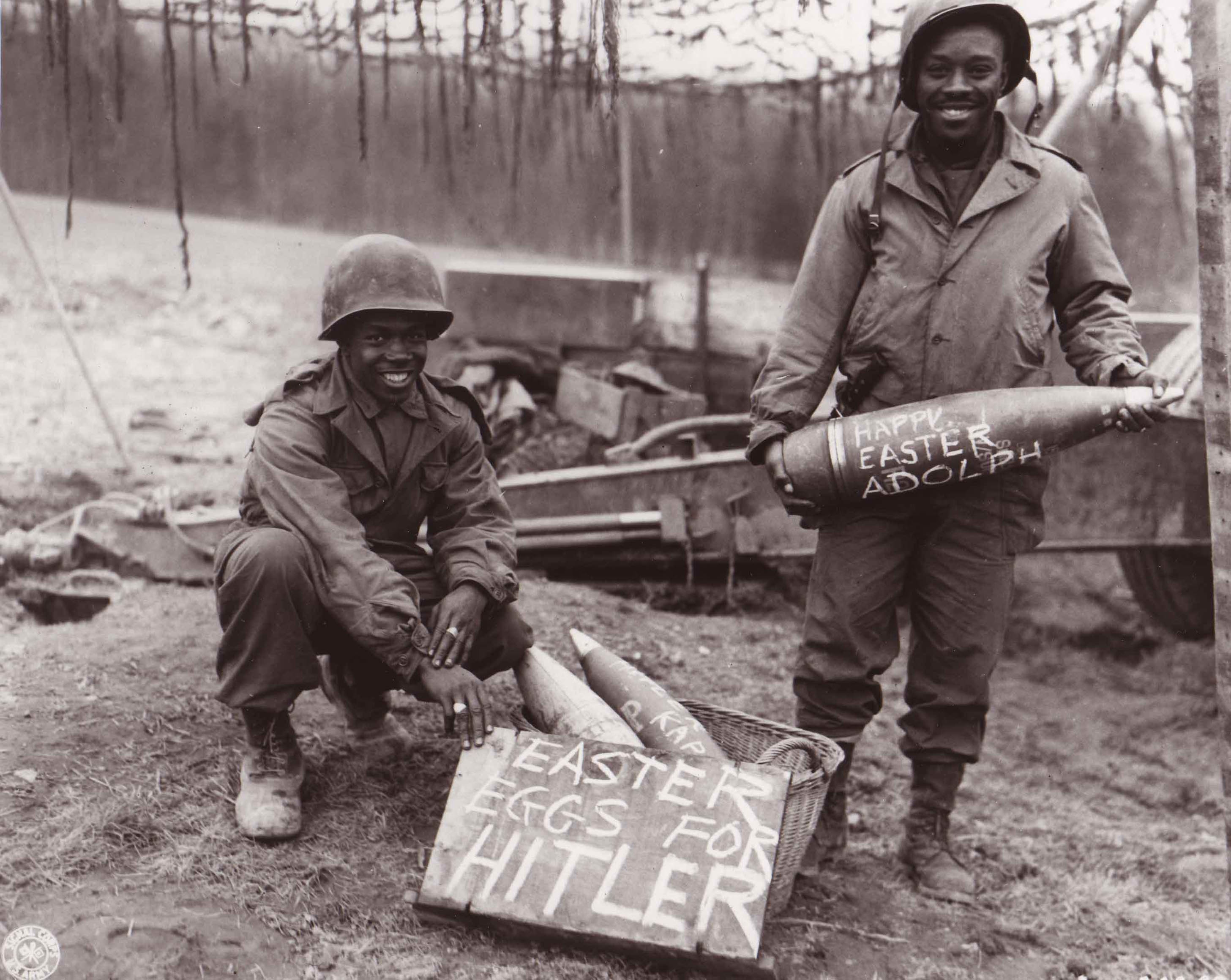
U.S. Army troops in Europe, spring 1945, with artillery shells labeled as "Easter eggs for Hitler".

Field artillery is a category of mobile artillery used to support armies in the field. These weapons are specialized for mobility, tactical proficiency, short range, long range, and extremely long range target engagement.

Until the early 20th century, field artillery were also known as foot artillery, for while the guns were pulled by beasts of burden (often horses), the gun crews would usually march on foot, thus providing fire support mainly to the infantry. This was in contrast to horse artillery, whose emphasis on speed while supporting cavalry units necessitated lighter guns and crews riding on horseback.

Whereas horse artillery has been superseded by self-propelled artillery, field artillery has survived to this day both in name and mission, albeit with motor vehicles towing the guns (this towed artillery arrangement is often called mobile artillery), carrying the crews and transporting the ammunition. Modern artillery has also advanced to rapidly deployable wheeled and tracked vehicles and precision delivered munitions capable of striking targets at ranges between 15 and 30 kilometers.

== Types ==
- Field guns – capable of long range fire
- Gun howitzers – capable of high or low angle fire with a long barrel
- Howitzers – capable of high angle fire
- Infantry support guns – directly support infantry units (mostly obsolete)
- Gun mortars – breech-loaded mortars capable of high or low angle fire.
- Mortars – weapons that fire projectiles at an angle of over 45 degrees to the horizontal, modern versions being lightweight with fin-stabilized explosive ammunition
- Mountain guns – lightweight weapons that can be moved through difficult terrain (mostly obsolete)
- Multiple rocket launchers – mobile rocket artillery launchers

== History ==
=== Early modern era ===
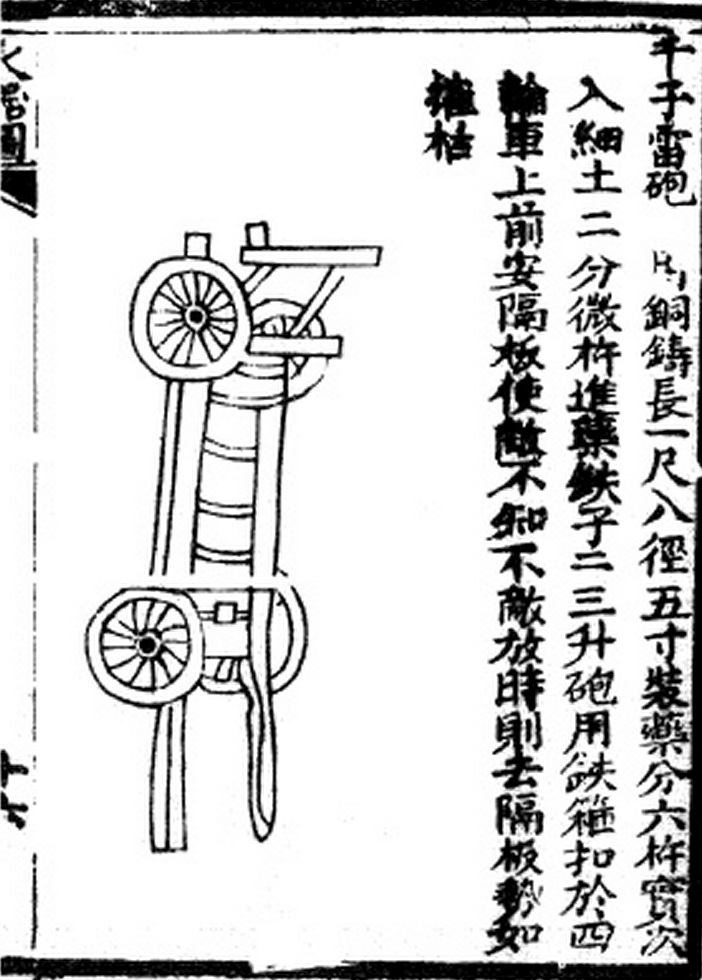
An illustration of a bronze "thousand ball thunder cannon" from the 14th-century Ming Dynasty book Huolongjing. The cannon is an early example of pre-modern mobile battlefield artillery.

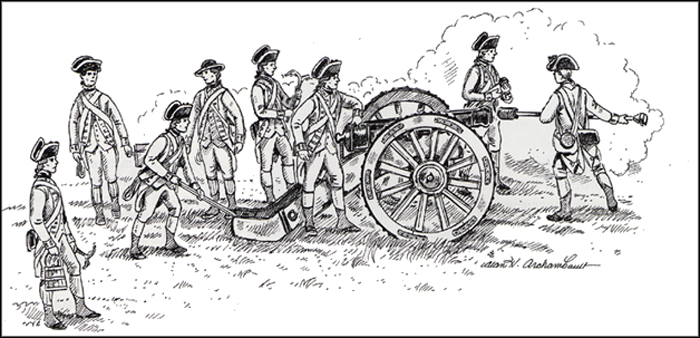
American artillery crew during the Revolutionary War.

Early artillery was unsuited to the battlefield, as the extremely massive pieces could not be moved except in areas that were already controlled by the combatant. Thus, their role was limited to such functions as breaking sieges. Following the beginning of the gunpowder era, the first field artillery came into being as metallurgy allowed thinner cannon barrels to withstand the explosive forces without bursting. However, there was still a serious risk of the constant changes of the battlefield conspiring to leave behind slow-moving artillery units – either on the advance, or more dangerously, in retreat. Artillery units were particularly vulnerable to assault by light cavalry, which were frequently used in this role. Only with a number of further inventions (such as the limber, hitched to the trail of a wheeled artillery piece equipped with trunnions), did the concept of field artillery really take off.

The medieval Ming dynasty Chinese invented mobile battlefield artillery during the early part of the fourteenth century at the time when gunpowder and the primordial cannon were first being adopted in the West. One of the earliest documented uses of field artillery is found in the 14th-century Ming Dynasty treatise Huolongjing. The text describes a Chinese cannon called a "thousand ball thunder cannon", manufactured of bronze and fastened with wheels. The book also describes another mobile form of artillery called a "barbarian attacking cannon" consisting of a cannon attached to a two-wheel carriage.

=== 20th century ===
Before World War I, field artillery batteries generally fired directly at visible targets measured in distances of meters and yards. Today, modern field batteries measure targets in kilometers and miles and often do not directly engage the enemy with observed direct fire. The hundredfold increase in the range of artillery guns in the 20th century has been the result of development of rifled cannons, improvements in propellants, better communications between observer and gunner, and technical improvements in gunnery computational abilities.

Most field artillery situations require indirect fire due to weather, terrain, night-time conditions, distance, or other obstacles. These gunners can also rely upon a trained artillery observer, also called a forward observer, who sees the target and relays the coordinates of the target to their fire direction center, which in turn translates those coordinates into: a left-right aiming direction; an elevation angle; a calculated number of bags of propellant; and finally a fuze with a determined waiting time before exploding (if necessary) to be set, which is then mated to the artillery projectile now ready to be fired.

== US field artillery team ==
Modern field artillery (i.e. post-World War I) has three distinct sections: All batteries have a Fire Support Man (Forward Observer), Fire Direction Control (FDC), and Cannoners (Gunner).

The FOs are forward with the infantry (in support role) where they can see the targets and Call For Fire (CFF) upon them. They call the FDC on the radio and transmit a request for fire in the format of CFF. The FDC calculates the CFF and send a deflection and elevation to the gun line. The gun line cranks the specified elevation and deflection on the howitzers, punch the artillery shell followed by the bag (powder). Depending on the CFF, the gunline will fire the round when they are ready or when the FO calls and tells them to fire. The FO spots the round and sends a correction back to the FDC and the process starts all over again until it's done.

The batteries are many kilometres behind the FLOT (Forward Line of Troops). They plan a location where they can be Fire Capability for some certain amount of time and do multiple fire missions before needing to displace.

In normal operations the FOs locate targets and transmits the CFF to the FDCs.

They can also calculate "defensive fire" tasks. These are pre‑planned missions, typically just in front of or upon one's own positions, designed with the intention of either suppressing potential attacks (where fire is dropped just in front of a friendly position), or in dropping fire on a recently abandoned or overrun position to prevent the enemy from consolidating there. Because the calculations have already been done, the fire can be called down very quickly when it is needed.

=== Reconnaissance and advance party ===
The advance party consists of the battery commander, his driver, first sergeant, gunnery sergeant, FDC guide, gun guides, and communications representatives. Initially the Party looks to find suitable positions for an artillery unit to perform fire missions from. Then they perform what is known as route reconnaissance. The primary purpose of this reconnaissance is to determine the suitability of the route of the unit's movement. Items to be analyzed include possible alternate routes, cover, concealment, location of obstacles, likely ambush sites, contaminated areas, route marking requirements, and the time and distance required to traverse the route. Several factors are taken into consideration. Once a location is determined and having arrived at the new position the advance party conducts a security sweep and prepares the position for occupation. The purpose of the advance party security with METT-T and the absence of enemy troops, mines, booby traps, NBC hazards, and so on. If these threats or conditions are present in the proposed position area, the advance party breaks contact with any enemy forces or marks minefield and hazards and moves on to find another position area. The battery commander can coordinate for additional assets, or augment the advance party with internal assets, to provide the additional ability to clear areas of small enemy forces, obstacles, and minefields. Natural cover must be used to the maximum. Security is continuous throughout advance party operations. Once a location is determined to be safe the advance party prepares the position for eventual howitzer emplacement. This consists of several procedures such as escorting each howitzer to its prepared position, setting up communications, providing the unit with its initial azimuth of fire, and providing each gun with an initial deflection. In the case of the U.S. Army, this entire process is covered in U.S. Army Field Manual 6-50 Chapter 2.

=== Forward observer ===
Because artillery is an indirect fire weapon, the forward observer (FO) must take up a position where he can observe the target using tools such as binoculars and laser rangefinders and call back fire missions on his radio or telephone.

The FO usually establishes a covered and concealed observation post (OP) on the ground, from which he can see the enemy. However, he may also be airborne—this was one of the first uses of aircraft in World War I. He must take great care not to be observed by the enemy, especially if in a static position. Discovery of an FO does not only jeopardize his personal safety; it also hampers the ability of the battery to lay fire.

Using a standardized format, the FO sends map references and bearing to target, a brief target description, a recommended munition to use, and any special instructions such as "danger close" (the warning that friendly troops are within 600 meters of the target when using artillery, requiring extra precision from the guns).

The FO and the battery iteratively "walk" the fire onto the target. The Fire Direction Center (FDC) signals the FO that they have fired and the FO knows to observe fall of shot. He then signals corrections. These are normally of the form of left/right of the bearing line and distance along it, for example "right 50 add 100" (distance in meters). When the fire is good enough the FO signals "target on, fire for effect".

If the mission requires a walking barrage, he may continue sending correction orders.

The FO may be called upon to direct fire for close air support and/or naval artillery in addition to field artillery based howitzer and infantry-embedded mortar units. The U.S. Army Field Manual describing the duties and responsibilities is FM 6‑30, Tactics, Techniques, and Procedures for Observed Fire.

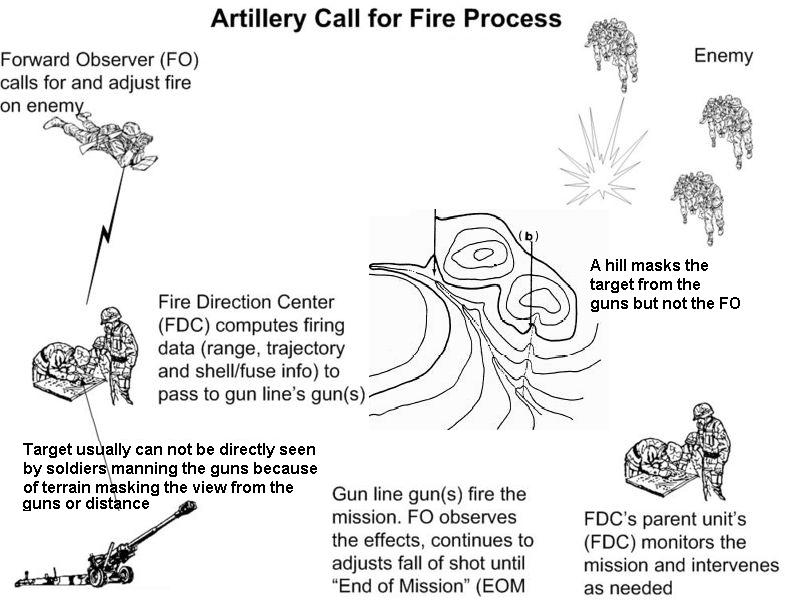
Calling in and adjusting artillery fire on a target visible to a forward observer but not to the soldiers manning the guns, themselves

=== Fire direction center ===
Typically, there is one FDC for a battery of six guns, in a light division. In a typical heavy division configuration, there exist two FDC elements capable of operating two four-gun sections, also known as a split battery. The FDC computes firing data—fire direction—for the guns. The process consists of determining the precise target location based on the observer's location if needed, then computing range and direction to the target from the guns' location. These data can be computed manually, using special protractors and slide rules with precomputed firing data. Corrections can be added for conditions such as a difference between target and howitzer altitudes, propellant temperature, atmospheric conditions, and even the curvature and rotation of the Earth. In most cases, some corrections are omitted, sacrificing accuracy for speed. In recent decades, FDCs have become computerized, allowing for much faster and more accurate computation of firing data. The FDC at the battalion level is responsible for recording friendly and enemy positions, tracking available battery munitions, and determining the optimal response for engaging a target identified by the FO.

=== Command post ===
In most Artillery Batteries the Command Post (CP) controls the firing of the guns. It is usually located at the battery center so as to be able to communicate easily with the guns. The CP should be well camouflaged, but the CPO (Command Post Officer) should be able to see all the guns with ease. Gun markers are sometimes placed in front of the CP to remind the CPO which gun is in which position. The CPO is assisted by two "Acks"—i.e., assistants—who operate the fire data computers. The GPO (Gun Position Officer) and CPO work at the plotter to ensure that the data calculated by the Acks is accurate and safe. The CP signaller is contact with the OP, or Observation Post, where the Forward Observer Officer (FOO), works with the OP team to identify targets and call-back fire data. In recent years headset radios have become common for communication between the CPO and gun detachment commanders.

=== Firing unit ===
The final piece of the puzzle is the firing unit itself. The FDC will transmit a warning order to the guns, followed by orders specifying the type of ammunition and fuze setting, bearing, elevation, and the method of adjustment or orders for fire for effect (FFE). Elevation (vertical direction) and bearing orders are specified in mils, and any special instructions, such as to wait for the observer's command to fire relayed through the FDC. The crews load the howitzers and traverse and elevate the barrel to the required point, using either hand cranks (usually on towed guns) or hydraulics (on self-propelled models).

== Counter-battery fire ==
Fire aimed at disabling or destroying enemy guns is known as counter-battery fire.

Removing the threat posed by enemy artillery is an important objective on the battlefield. Most of the time enemy batteries are too far away for the infantry to engage, so it falls to artillery to do this job.

The battery uses a variety of techniques to calculate the position of the enemy battery, then can lay fire upon it. If possible, a FO can access a position to call fire on enemy guns directly; either on the ground or in the air, or a battery can be located using counter-battery radar, which can be used to observe the fall of enemy shells and thus calculate their trajectory. A correctly calculated trajectory will reveal the location from which the shell was fired, which information can then be passed on to a friendly battery command post as a fire mission.

=== Defenses against counter-battery fire ===
To defend against counter battery fire there are two points of attack: either remove the enemy's ability to observe or make his observations irrelevant/obsolete.

To remove the ability to observe one must attack the observation assets. Because most counter-battery radar is active, the location can be determined electronically from listening to the beams. If one suspects one's position is being observed by a covert FO then a mission, either artillery or infantry, will be raised to deal with this threat.

Alternatively one can choose to make their observations obsolete by repeatedly moving the guns: hence self-propelled guns.

Ordinary towed guns can take a while to emplace and re-limber and are not armoured, so they are vulnerable to counter battery fire and take a while to engage when at a new location.

Self-propelled guns do not suffer from these restrictions. They can drive up, drop their trails, fire and move on. Because of their armour they are less vulnerable to counter-battery fire. However, this armor is light by comparison to that of a tank, so it protects only from light fire (e.g., machine guns) and shrapnel.

Another disadvantage of self-propelled guns is that they tend to be equipped with lighter, less accurate guns. Depending on the nature of the battle being fought, either or both of these drawbacks could prove a severe restriction. However, this is not necessarily true of modern self-propelled guns such as the German PzH 2000. This has a 155 mm main armament that can with assisted firing charges reach 60 km, has a maximum speed of 67 km/h (41 mph) on road surface and 45 km/h (28 mph) off-road, and has a fully computerised fire-control system that enables it to fire-move-fire before the enemy can pin it down for counter-battery fire. It has a rate of fire of 10 rounds per minute.

== Parent battalion and U.S. Army brigade/USMC regimental FDCs ==
FDCs also exist in the next higher parent battalion that "owns" two to four artillery batteries. Once again, an FDC exists at the U.S. Army brigade or USMC regimental level that "owns" the battalions. These higher level FDCs monitor the fire missions of their subordinate units and will coordinate the use of multiple batteries or even multiple battalions in what is called a battalion or brigade/regimental mission. In training and wartime exercises, as many as 72 guns from 3 battalions may all be coordinated to put "steel on the target" in what is called a "brigade/regimental time on target" or brigade/regimental TOT for short. The rule is "silence is consent", meaning that if the lower unit does not hear a "cancel the mission" (don't shoot) or even a "check firing" (cease firing) order from the higher monitoring unit, then the mission goes on. Higher level units monitor their subordinate unit's missions both for active as well as passive purposes. Higher-level units may also get involved to coordinate artillery fire across fire support coordination boundaries (often parallel lines on maps) where one unit can not fire into without permission from higher and/or adjacent units that "own" the territory.

== Major artillery battles ==
- Battle of Castillon
- Battle of Fort Sumter
- Siege of Vicksburg
- Battle of Chaldiran
- First Battle of Panipat
- Battle of Khanua
- Battle of the Somme
- Battle of Vimy Ridge
- Third Battle of Ypres
- Battle of Tali-Ihantala
- Siege of Dien Bien Phu
- Battle of the Bulge
- Battle of Bloody Ridge
- Battle of Old Baldy
- Battle of Kumsong
- Battle of Norfolk
- Battle of Ilomantsi (1944)
- Vyborg–Petrozavodsk Offensive
- Battle of Malvern Hill
- Battle of Antietam
- Siege of Petersburg
- Battle of Nam Dong
- Sino-Vietnamese conflicts 1979–90
- Battle of Vyborg Bay (1944)
- Battle of Go Cong
- Operation Hump
- Battle of Pork Chop Hill
- Siege of Petropavlovsk
- Battle of Aachen
- Battle of Triangle Hill
- Battle of Chipyong-ni
- Battle of Dong Dang (1979)
- Battle of Kollaa
- Battle of Suursaari
- Tartu Offensive
- Battle of the Seelow Heights
- Battle of Nietjärvi
- Battle of Tienhaara
- Battle of Berlin
- Siege of Yorktown
- Sino-Soviet border conflict
- Battle of Hanko (1941)
- Battle of the Oder–Neisse
- Battle of Halbe
- Second Battle of Fallujah
- Operation Medusa
- Siege of Sangin
- Battle of Mạo Khê
- Battle of Long Dinh
- Battle of Chosin Reservoir
- Battle for Outpost Vegas
- Battle of Khe Sanh
- Battle of Alma
- Operation Queen
- Battle of Khafji
- Battle of Garmsir
- Battle of Gettysburg
- Operation Eagle's Summit
- Battle of Remagen
- Second Battle of Donetsk Airport
- Operation Magistral
- Operation Cobra
- Battle of Smolensk (1943)
- Baltic Offensive
- Siege of Basra
- Second Battle of al-Faw
- Battle of Königsberg
- Battle of Stallupönen
- Battle of Gumbinnen
- Battle of Tannenberg
- Battle of Gnila Lipa
- Battle of Nà Sản
- Battle of Haktang-ni
- Battle of Fire Support Base Ripcord
- Battle of Pakchon
- Battle of Chatkol
- Siege of Silistra
- Battle of Lanzerath Ridge
- Firebase Bird
- Osowiec Fortress
- Battle of Bolimów
- Gorlice–Tarnów Offensive
- Great Retreat (Russian)
- Siege of Novogeorgievsk
- Lake Naroch Offensive
- Christmas Battles
- Battle of Jugla
- Battle of Dinant
- Siege of Namur (1914)
- Battle of Mons
- First Battle of Ypres
- Siege of Maubeuge
- Battle of Le Cateau
- Battle of Le Grand Fayt
- Action at Néry
- Outpost Harry
- Battle of the Hook
- Battle of Tannenberg Line
- Operation Starlite
- Third Battle of Seoul
- Erzurum Offensive
- Battle of Moscow
- Operation Before the Dawn
- Operation Union
- Battle of Neuve Chapelle
- Second Battle of Champagne
- Third Battle of Champagne
- Third Battle of Artois
- Battle of La Malmaison
- Third Battle of the Aisne
- Battle of Amiens (1918)
- Battle of the Selle
- Battle of Elsenborn Ridge
- Battle of Vuosalmi
- Battle of Cao Bang (1979)
- Finnish reconquest of Ladoga Karelia (1941)
- Battle of Tuloksa
- Battle of Oktwin
- Battle of Mong Cai
- Battle for Narva Bridgehead
- Battle of Ap Bac
- Battle of the Ch'ongch'on River
- Battle of the Imjin River
- Battle of An Lộc
- Battle of Kiev (1943)
- Battle of Kapyong
- Kargil War

== See also ==
- Circular error probable - metric used to assess precision of a given field artillery piece
- Field Artillery Branch (United States)
- Field artillery in the American Civil War
- Swedish field artillery (early 18th century)
- List of artillery
- List of artillery by type § Field artillery
