= Henri Moreau de Melen =

Belgian soldier and politician

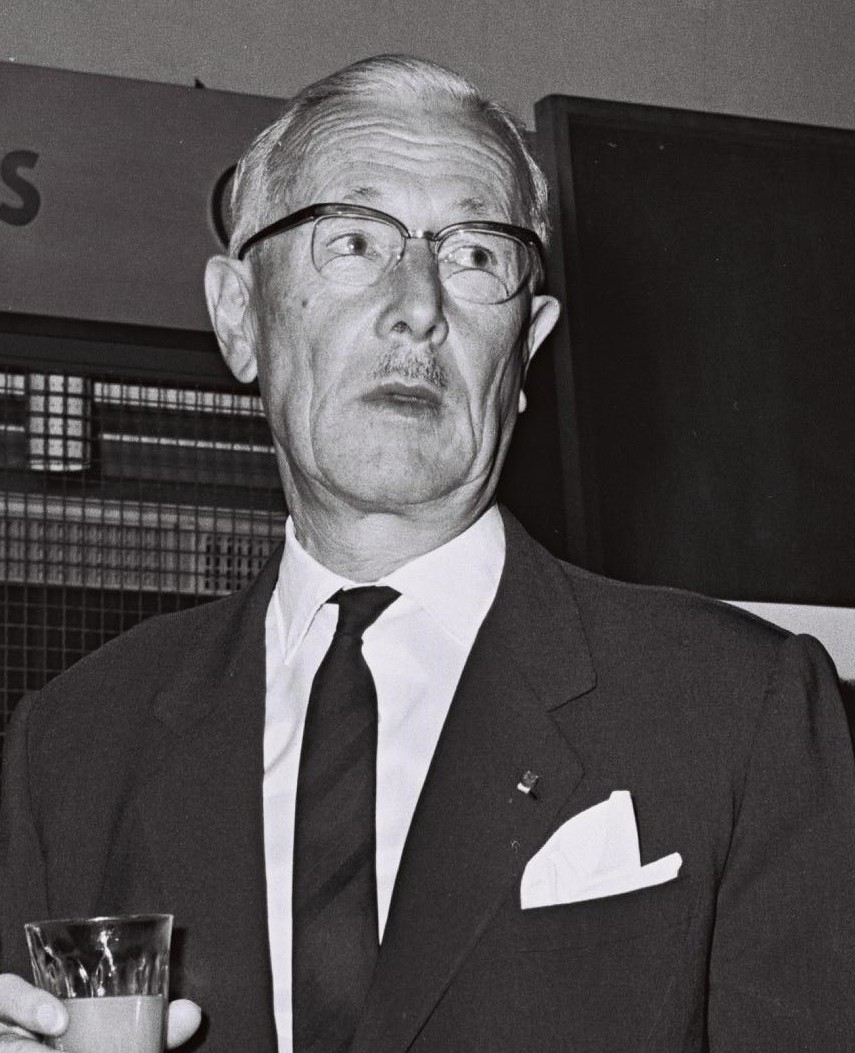

Minister of Justice
- In office 27 November 1948 – 11 August 1949
- Preceded by: Paul Struye
- Succeeded by: Albert Lilar

Minister of Defence
- In office 8 June 1950 – 16 August 1950
- Preceded by: Albert Devèze
- Succeeded by: Etienne De Greef

Personal details
- Born: Eugène Ernest Marie Henri Moreau de Melen; 20 August 1902; Liège, Belgium
- Died: 31 May 1992 (aged 89); Liège, Belgium
- Political party: Christian Social Party PSC-CVP

Eugène Ernest Marie Henri Moreau de Melen (20 August 1902 – 31 May 1992) was a Belgian soldier and politician, most notable for holding the position of Minister of Justice and Minister of Defence. He resigned his office and served with the Belgian battalion during the Korean War (1950–1953).

== Background and personal life ==
Henri Moreau de Melen was born in Liège, Belgium on 20 August 1902. His father, Eugène Moreau, was a professor at the University of Liège. His mother was Marie Malherbe. Henri studied for a law degree and later practiced as a lawyer in Liège. He served as a lieutenant in the Belgian Army during the German invasion of Belgium in World War II in May 1940. He was taken prisoner of war and held at Oflag X-D until 1945.

== Career and Resignation ==
After the end of the war, Moreau began a political career with the newly founded centre-right Christian Social Party (Parti social chrétien, PSC). He was elected as a senator in 1946 for the arrondissement of Liège.

Moreau served as Minister of Justice in the coalition government of Paul-Henri Spaak between 1948 and 1949. He subsequently also served as Minister of Defence in the PSC majority government of Joseph Pholien. His term coincided with the decision to send Belgian forces to fight in the Korean War.

Moreau was a staunch royalist, and was so disillusioned by the resignation of Leopold III in August 1950 following the "Royal Question" that he resigned his ministerial post to enlist in the Belgian Volunteer Corps for Korea as a major. He subsequently served in Korea and was second-in-command of the force commanded by Albert Crahay. He finished the war with the rank of lieutenant-colonel. He had a Brevet état-major.

After his return from Korea, he returned to politics and resumed his position as senator for Liège which he held until 1968. In 1968, in recognition of his service to Belgium, he was ennobled and given the title "Baron".

== Personal life ==
He married Marie-Louise Ancion (1904–63) in 1931. After her death, he re-married in 1970 to Countess Jacqueline de Lalaing (1910–2006). He had no children.

== Reading ==
- Henri Moreau de Melen, Mémoires. Au terme de la route, 1988.
- Thierry Grosbois, Moreau de Melen. Mémoires: de Léopold III à la Corée, Racine, Brussels 2009.
