= Belgian Volunteer Corps for Korea =

UN military contingent of the Korean War

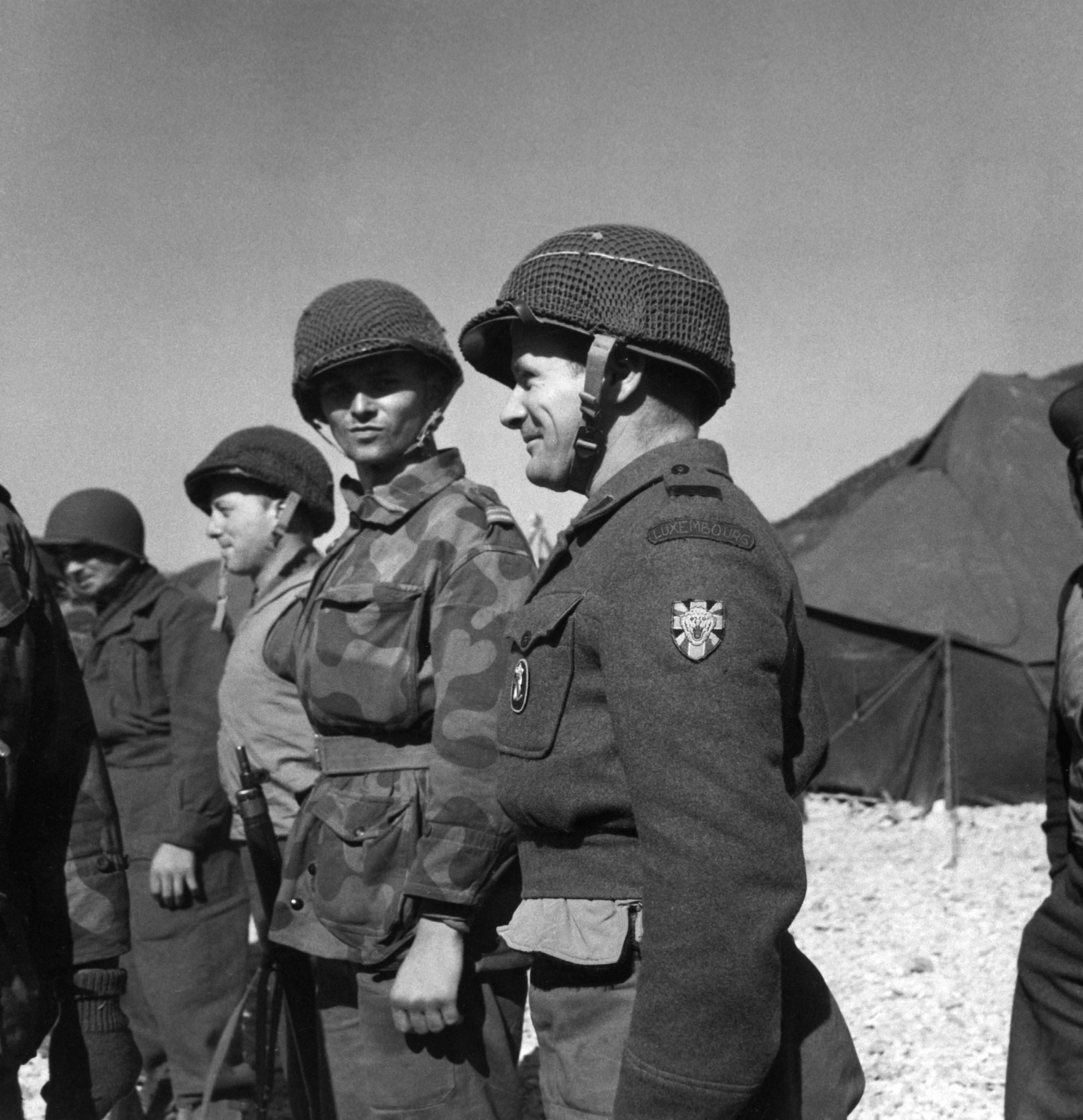
- A Luxembourgish soldier in Korea in 1953
- Active: 1950–1955
- Countries: Belgium; Luxembourg
- Allegiance: United Nations
- Type: Infantry battalion
- Size: Total: 3,171 Belgians; 78 Luxembourgers
- Part of: 29th Commonwealth Brigade; 1st US Cavalry Division; 3rd US Infantry Division
- Engagements: Korean War; Battle of the Imjin River; Battle of Haktang-ni; Battle of Chatkol
- Decorations: 2 ROK Presidential Unit Citations; US Presidential Unit Citation; Belgian Order of Leopold

Commanders
- Notable commanders: Albert Crahay; Lt. Col. G. Vivario; Lt. Col. R. Gathy

The Volunteer Corps for Korea (French: Corps de Volontaires pour la Corée; Dutch: Vrijwilligerskorps voor Korea) was a Belgium–Luxembourg military force sent to assist United Nations Command in the defence of South Korea during the Korean War (1950-1953). A battalion-sized infantry unit, it arrived in Korea in 1951 and notably played an important role in the Battle of the Imjin River. The Belgian battalion remained after the cease-fire until 1955. Over the course of its existence, 3,171 Belgians and 78 Luxembourgers served in the unit.

== Background ==
Belgium, a country in Western Europe, became a signatory member of the United Nations (UN) in 1945 in the aftermath of World War II but had few pre-existing ties with East Asia. The Belgian Army operated a system of national service and already had sizeable commitments as part of the army of occupation in West Germany.

At the time the Korean War broke out in June 1950 the country was in the midst of a political crisis known as the Royal Question. This related to whether King Leopold III should be able to return to the throne after his actions in German-occupied Belgium in World War II but created a wider confrontation between left-leaning communist, socialist and trade-union circles which opposed the King's return and conservatives who supported it. The crisis brought the centre-right Christian Social Party to power although a compromise solution was found in August 1950 under which the King abdicated in favour of his son.

Prime Minister Joseph Pholien was opposed to the rise of communism abroad and wished to gain support from the United States. Both Belgian and Luxembourg governments decided to raise a volunteer-only formation to serve under UN command in the defence of South Korea.

== Training ==
Over 2,000 Belgians volunteered for service in B.U.N.C. Of these, initially only 700 were selected for training at Leopoldsburg. After training, volunteers received their characteristic brown berets. Soldiers from Luxembourg who were trained alongside the Belgians were organised into 1st Platoon, A Company of B.U.N.C.

The Belgian-Luxembourg Corps sailed from Antwerp to Pusan and arrived on 31 January 1951. On arrival in Korea, some South Korean troops were made part of the Belgian contingent in order to bring the regiment up to correct battalion strength along the lines of the US "KATUSA" or Commonwealth "KATCOM" programme.

== At the front ==
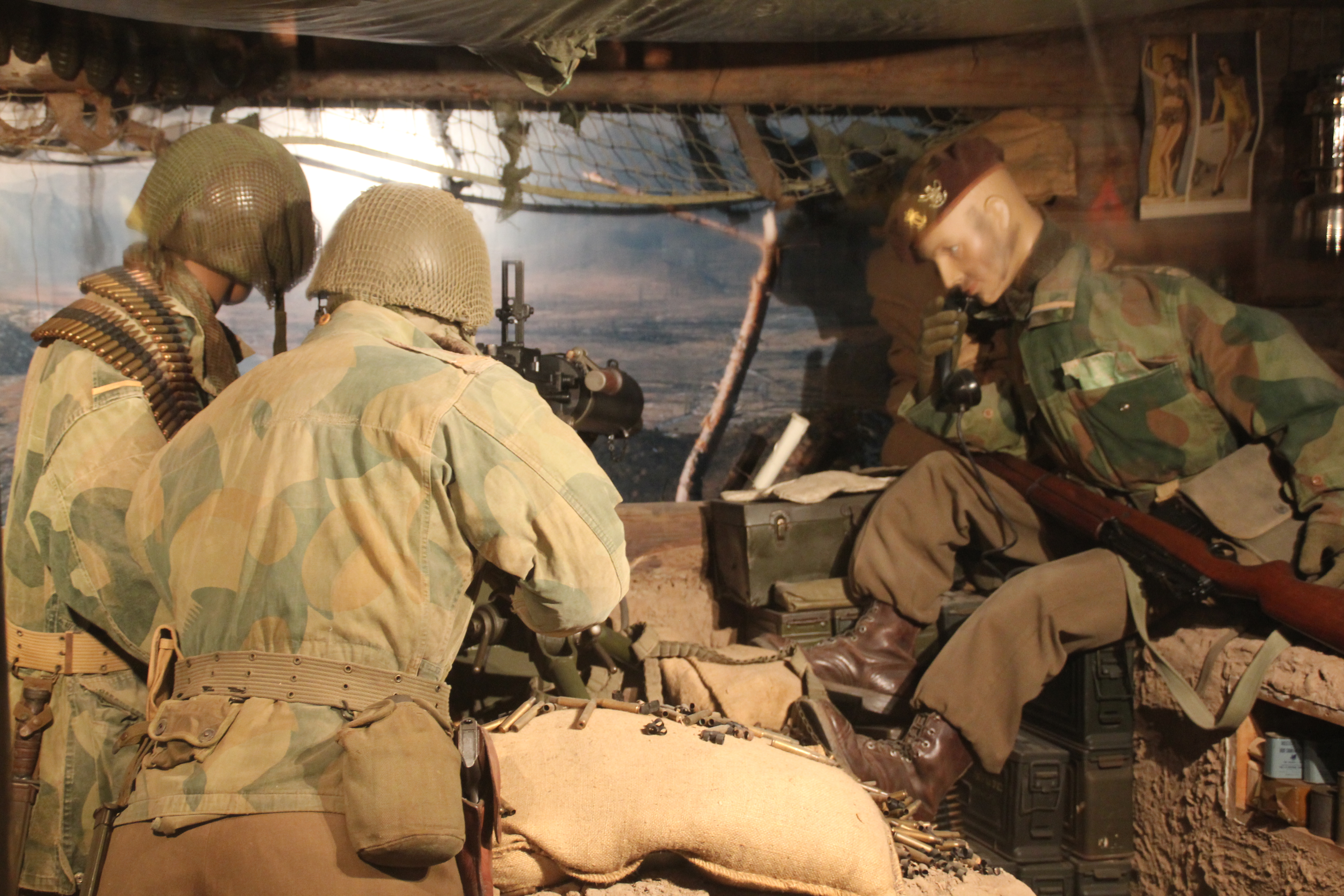
Diorama showing Luxembourgish soldiers defending a fortified position during the Korean War (National Museum of Military History)

In April 1951, the Belgians fought in one of the key battles of the Korean War – the Battle of the Imjin River. The First Battalion was relieved by a new battalion fresh from Belgium in August 1951 which stayed until 1955.

At the Battle of the Imjin River in 1951, the Belgian battalion held a key pass alongside the British Gloucestershire Regiment. For actions at the Imjin, the Belgians received a US Presidential Citation. During the battle, Albert Crahay, commander of the unit, was wounded by a Chinese phosphorus shell and was evacuated to a hospital in Japan.

=== Tactical Role and Operational Legacy ===
During their deployment alongside the U.S. 3rd Infantry Division, the Belgian Volunteer Corps was frequently assigned to critical defensive sectors requiring high mobility and stubborn endurance. Operating without an independent artillery unit, the battalion relied on close coordination with attached U.S. and UN artillery units. The battalion's defensive resilience earned them a U.S. Presidential Unit Citation for holding off overwhelming Chinese forces at the Imjin River, alongside two Republic of Korea Presidential Unit Citations. Because of their tactical effectiveness and to maintain unit strength, South Korean soldiers (KATUSA) were routinely integrated directly into the Belgian companies.

B.U.N.C. continued to see action and went on to earn further battle honours at Haktang-Ni – one of the series of battles at Broken Arrow – in October 1951 when the Belgians took up position on an isolated hillside and suffered relentless Chinese attacks which they successfully repelled, killing over a hundred Chinese and losing only a handful of men themselves.

The last main action fought by the Belgian contingent was at the Battle of Chatkol in April 1953. Belgian forces held a defensive arc position in the Iron Triangle for over 55 nights of Chinese assaults.

After the cease-fire, it was seen as unnecessary to keep BUNC up to the strength it had during the war and it was reduced to some 200 men on 30 December 1954, but, like other UN contingents, it was viewed as necessary to maintain a presence in Korea during the uncertain peace following the negotiations at Panmunjom and the last members of the unit finally left Korea on 15 June 1955.

== Commanders ==
=== Belgian Commanders ===
Dates in Command	Name of Commander (all held rank of Lieutenant-Colonel in Korea)	Notable event during command	Future career
September 28, 1950 – November 21, 1951	Albert Crahay	First Commander of the Contingent; Battle of the Imjin River. Wounded by Phosphorus Grenade	Retired with rank of Lieutenant General. He also commanded the Belgian army of occupation in Germany.
November 21, 1951 – February 23, 1952	Norbert Cools	Replaced for health reasons.	
February 23, 1952 – February 13, 1953	Georges Vivario	Battle of Haktang-ni	Became Commander of the Joint General Staff and retired with the rank of Lieutenant General.
February 12, 1953 – July 12, 1953	Robert Gathy	Battle of Chatkol	
July 12, 1953 – December 19, 1953	Bodart	Armistice in the Korean War	
December 19, 1953 – May 27, 1954	Brichant (Major) (temp.)		
February 27, 1954 – August 14, 1955	Pierlot	Belgian United Nations Command disbanded	

=== Luxembourgish Commanders ===
Dates in Command	Name of Commander (all held rank of Lieutenant in Korea)	Notable event during command	Future career
October 1, 1951 – September 30, 1951	Joseph "Jos" Wagener	1st Luxembourgish Detachment, Operations around the Han River, Battle of the Imjin River	Later Lt. Col.
February 4, 1952 – February 3, 1953	Rodolphe "Rudy" Lutty	2nd Luxembourgish Detachment, Battle of King Post	

== "Belgians Can Do Too!" ==
BELGIANS CAN DO TOO! was a slogan written across the windshield of Padre of the Unit's (Padre Vander Goten) Jeep during the battles around the "Iron Triangle." Seeing the exhaustion of the troops, the Padre copied the motto of the US 15th Infantry Regiment ("Can Do") alongside whom the Belgians were serving at the time to try to raise morale. The phrase was made famous in Belgium and is thought to summarise the spirit and courage of the Belgian contingent.

== Casualties ==
101 Belgian soldiers, 2 Luxembourgish soldiers and 9 South Korean soldiers attached to the Belgian contingent were killed in action during the war. 478 Belgians and 17 Luxembourgers were wounded in action and 5 Belgians are still posted as missing in action. 2 died in North Korean POW Camps.

== Battle honours ==
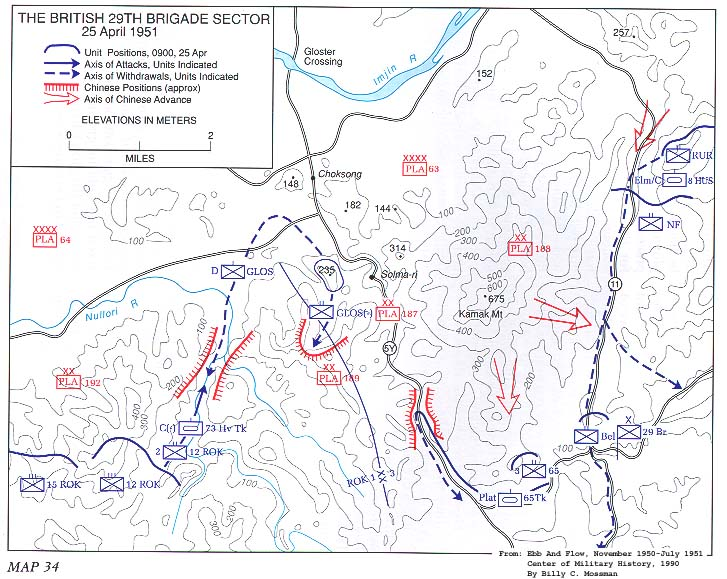
The British 29th Brigade Sector during the Battle of the Imjin River, 25 April 1951. The positions of the Belgian battalion are also marked at the bottom.

B.U.N.C. was awarded two South Korean Presidential Unit Citations and one American Unit Citation.

The text of the US Presidential Unit Citation for actions at the Imjin River:

The Belgian battalion with the Luxembourg detachment of the UN Forces in Korea is mentioned for exceptional execution of its missions and for its remarkable heroism in its actions against the enemy on the Imjin, near Hantangang, Korea during the period from 20 till 26 April 1951. The Belgian battalion with the Luxembourg detachment, one of the smallest units of the UNO in Korea, has inflicted thirty-fold losses on the enemy compared to its own, due to its aggressive and courageous actions against the Communist Chinese. During this period considerable enemy forces, supported by fire by machine guns, mortars and artillery, repeatedly and heavily attacked the positions held by the battalion but, Belgians and Luxembourgers have continuously and bravely repulsed these fanatic attacks by inflicting heavy losses to the enemy forces...The extraordinary courage shown by the members of this units during this period has bestowed extraordinary honor on their country and on themselves

By order of

General Van Fleet.

The Belgian-Luxembourg Corps served at three key battles of the Korean War – the Battle of the Imjin River and Battle of Haktang-ni 1951, and the Battle of Chatkol 1953.

== Commemoration ==
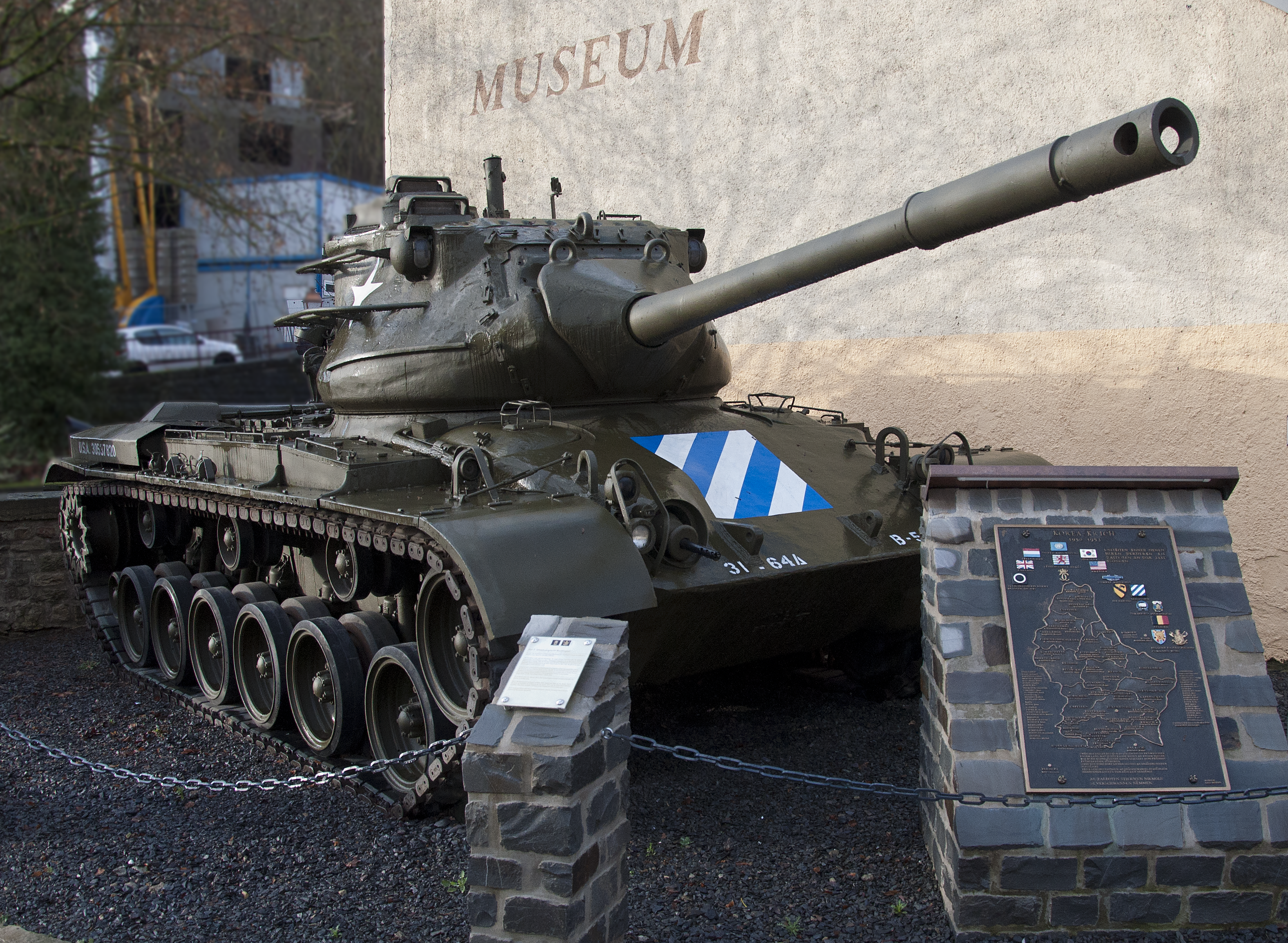
Memorial to the Luxembourgish participation with a Patton tank at the National Museum of Military History, Diekirch.

The 3rd Parachute Battalion maintains the traditions (including the flag and badge) of BUNC and is based in Tielen.

=== Museums ===
- The National Museum of Military History in Diekirch, Luxembourg has a permanent gallery and memorial on the participation of B.U.N.C in Korea.
- There is a small museum attached to the Barracks of the 3rd Parachute Battalion, Belgian Army, in Tielen, Belgium which focuses on the Belgian participation in the Korean War.
- In 2011, The Royal Museum of the Armed Forces and of Military History in Brussels, Belgium put on a temporary exhibition entitled Belgians Can Do Too! about B.U.N.C. in Korea.

=== Monuments ===
- Twin Belgian battalion monuments exist in Brussels – on Avenue Jules César- and in South Korea -Dongducheon-si in Gyeonggi-do province.
- There is a small monument outside the Freedom Protection Museum, also in Dongducheon-si, South Korea.
- There is also a small monument outside SHAPE Headquarters in Mons, Belgium.

== Notable personnel ==
- Michel Didisheim, later personal secretary to King Albert II
- Etienne Gailly, Bronze medal winner at the 1948 London Olympic Games served as Captain in BUNC alongside his brother Pierre.
- Pierre Francisse, 1948 London Olympic Games, track and 1960 Rome Olympic Games, Fencing (épée), was a Lieutenant in Korea. He was too severely wounded to continue his track event, and took up fencing for the Belgian Olympic team. Retired as a Colonel of the First Regiment Guides.
- Albert Guérisse was a notable member of the Belgian resistance during the Second World War. He created the Pat Line to help Allied Airmen escape capture in Nazi-Occupied Europe under the pseudonym Pat O'Leary. After serving in Korea he became the commander of the Belgian Medical Component with the rank of Major-General.
- Henri Moreau de Melen, Minister of Defence for the Christian Social Party (PSC-CVP) government who resigned his ministerial post and volunteered for service in Korea in 1950 with the rank of Major.
- Guy de Greef, a captain in B.U.N.C. and who served at the Battle of Chatkol in 1953 was the son of the Belgian Minister of Defense Eugène De Greef who held the post 1950–1954 after Moreau de Melen's resignation.
- Benoît Verhaegen, later a notable Africanist

== See also ==
- United Nations Forces in the Korean War
- Medical support in the Korean War
- Korean War
