= Jean-Baptiste Piron =

Belgian military commander (1896–1974)

- Piron, photographed c.1945
- Born: 10 April 1896; Couvin, Namur Province, Belgium
- Died: 4 September 1974 (aged 78); Uccle, Brussels, Belgium
- Spouse: Simone Roland (m. 1953)
- Military career
- Allegiance: Belgium
- Branch: Belgian Army; Free Belgian Forces
- Service years: 1914–1957
- Rank: Lieutenant General
- Commands: 1st Belgian Infantry Brigade; Belgian Army in Germany
- Conflicts: World War I; Yser Front; World War II; Battle of Belgium; Liberation of Belgium

Jean-Baptiste Piron (10 April 1896 – 4 September 1974) was a Belgian military officer, best known for his role in the Free Belgian forces during World War II as commander of the 1st Belgian Infantry Brigade, widely known as the "Piron Brigade", between 1942 and 1944.

Piron entered the Belgian Army and served during World War I as both a junior infantry officer and, briefly, in the Belgian Air Force. He rose through the ranks during the interwar period and held the rank of major at the time of the German invasion of Belgium in World War II. He subsequently escaped from German-occupied Belgium and reached the United Kingdom, where he led a re-organisation of the Free Belgian military. Promoted to the head of the 1st Belgian Infantry Brigade, he led the unit from 1942 to 1944, including on the Western Front in late 1944. He commanded the Belgian army of occupation in Germany in 1946–1947 and was aide de camp to Prince-Regent Charles and, later, to King Baudouin. He ended his career as lieutenant general and retired in 1957. He died in 1974.

== Early career ==
Piron was born in Couvin in Belgium's Province of Namur on 10 April 1896. He entered the Royal Military Academy in Brussels at the age of 17 in 1913. Following the German invasion of Belgium in August 1914 at the start of World War I, Piron, who had not finished his studies, was mobilised into the Belgian Army as a junior officer in the 2nd Regiment of the Line. He served with the Belgian army on the Yser Front and was promoted to the rank of lieutenant in 1916. After being hospitalised with appendicitis in October 1917, he was transferred to the Belgian Air Force and served as an air observer with the 6th Reconnaissance Squadron. He was wounded twice. At the end of the war in 1918, Piron held the rank of acting captain.

During the interwar period, Piron returned to his studies at the academy. He remained in the Belgian Army, serving in the headquarters of the 2nd Army Corps and later in the 1st Grenadier Regiment. Rising through the ranks to major, he served with the Regiment of Frontier Cyclists and later at the headquarters of the 5th Army Corps at the outbreak of the Phoney War.

== World War II ==
During World War II, Piron served during the German invasion of Belgium (10–28 May 1940), after which the Belgian Army surrendered and Belgium was placed under military occupation. Piron, however, refused to accept the Belgian surrender and succeeded in escaping from occupied Belgium via Vichy France and Spain to British Gibraltar. He arrived in Scotland in February 1942.

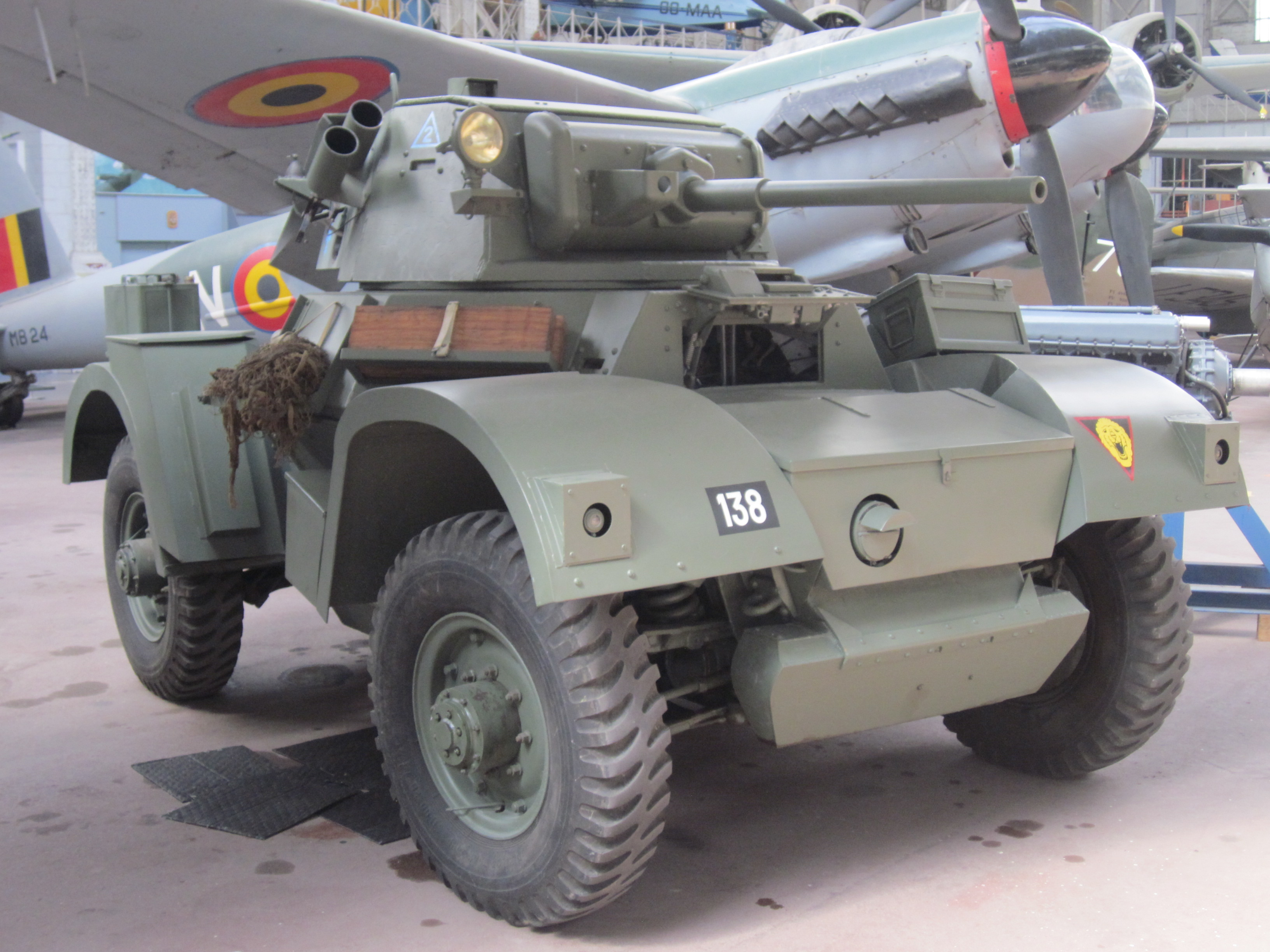
A Daimler Armoured Car in the markings of the Piron Brigade (Royal Museum of the Armed Forces and Military History)

The Belgian government in exile began to form a Free Belgian army in late 1940 among Belgian soldiers and expatriates who had succeeded in reaching the United Kingdom. Following his arrival in Britain, Piron was tasked with reforming the Belgian and Luxembourgish forces into an infantry battalion, an artillery battery, and an armoured squadron. The move followed a period of unrest among the Belgian troops which had culminated in a minor mutiny on 14 November, caused by inactivity and political infighting. The reaction by the incumbent commander, Colonel Lecomte, had been considered inadequate by the Belgian government. Piron, designated as Lecomte's successor, took command in December 1942 and became commander of the resulting unit, the 1st Belgian Infantry Brigade, on its formation in January 1943. The unit, numbering between 1,800 and 2,200 men, was soon popularly nicknamed the "Piron Brigade" (Brigade Piron) after him. He was promoted to the rank of colonel in 1944. His style of command earned him the nickname "the pasha" or "the lion". According to Luc De Vos, a historian, "it was [...] indisputably Piron who played the major role in transforming the unit into a well-oiled military machine".

The Brigade Piron was deployed to France in August 1944 following the Normandy Landings. Although it was kept in reserve for most of the campaign, the unit was deployed in combat in Normandy alongside the British 6th Airborne Division and, later, the Guards Armoured Division. Among other operations, the unit liberated the French town of Honfleur on 25 August. It was also involved in the Liberation of Belgium in September 1944 and entered Brussels on 4 September, the day after the arrival of the first British troops. The brigade was then moved to Dutch Limburg, where it participated in heavy fighting until November.

After the Liberation, Piron became aide de camp to Charles, Count of Flanders, who became prince regent in 1944 and commander of the 2nd Infantry Regiment. Piron was promoted to the rank of major general in December 1945.

== Post-war career ==
While still serving as aide to the prince regent, Piron was promoted to command the Belgian Army of Occupation (Armée belge d'occupation, or ABO; Belgische Bezettingsleger, BBL) in Allied-occupied Germany in March 1946. He was subsequently promoted to the rank of lieutenant general in December 1947. Piron enjoyed the role but was dismissed in 1951 after falling out with the Belgian Minister of Defence Eugène De Greef. He was transferred to head the Belgian Army's general staff, but Piron resented the move. He became aide to the prince regent's successor, King Baudouin, in 1951. In 1954 he was given a post as president of the Superior Council of the Armed Forces (Conseil supérieur des Forces armées, or CSFA) but still resented being transferred from the army in Germany.

Piron finally retired from the military in 1957. He published a memoir in 1969. He died of a heart attack in his home in Uccle, a suburb of Brussels, on the morning of 4 September 1974 after participating in the commemoration of the 30th anniversary of Brussels' Liberation.

== Publications ==
- Souvenirs 1913–1945 (Brussels: Renaissance du Livre, 1969).
