= Iron Triangle (Korea) =

Geographical area between North and South Korea

The Iron Triangle was a key communist Chinese and North Korean concentration area and communications junction during the Korean War, located in the central sector between Cheorwon and Kimhwa in the south and Pyonggang in the north.

The area was located 20 to 30 miles (30 to 50 kilometres) north of the 38th parallel in the diagonal corridor dividing the Taebaek Mountains into northern and southern ranges and contained the major road and rail links between the port of Wonsan in the northeast and Seoul in the southwest. During the war the area was the scene of heavy fighting between the Chinese People's Volunteer Army and the US Eighth Army during the Battle of White Horse Hill and the Battle of Triangle Hill in October–November 1952. The Battle of Pork Chop Hill in March–July 1953 took place to the west of the Iron Triangle. This complex was eventually named the "Iron Triangle" by newsmen searching for a dramatic term. Today, the region straddles the Demilitarized Zone.

== Battles ==
- Battle of Haktang-ni (9–13 October 1951)
- Battle of Hill Eerie (21 March – 18 July 1952)
- Battle of White Horse Hill (6–15 October 1952)
- Battle of Arrowhead Hill (6–10 October 1952; 29 June – 11 July 1953)
- Battle of Triangle Hill (14 October – 25 November 1952)
- Battle of Sniper Ridge (14 October – 25 November 1952)
- Battle of Chatkol (26 February – 21 April 1953)
- Battle of Pork Chop Hill (16–18 April; 6–11 July 1953)
- Battle of Outpost Harry (10–18 June 1953)
