= Gimhwa =

Gimhwa or Kimhwa may refer to:

- Kimhwa County (Korea): historical county of Korea.
- Kimhwa County: county of North Korea
- Gimhwa-eup: eup of South Korea
