= Belgian Army of Occupation =

Belgian Army of Occupation (French: Armée belge d'occupation, Dutch: Belgische Bezettingsleger) may refer to:

- Belgian Army of Occupation (1918-1929) in the Allied occupation of the Rhineland.
- Belgian Army of Occupation (1946-1955) in the Allied occupation of Germany.
