= Independent Belgian Brigade =

Unit of the Free Belgian forces during World War II

Independent Belgian Brigade "Piron Brigade"
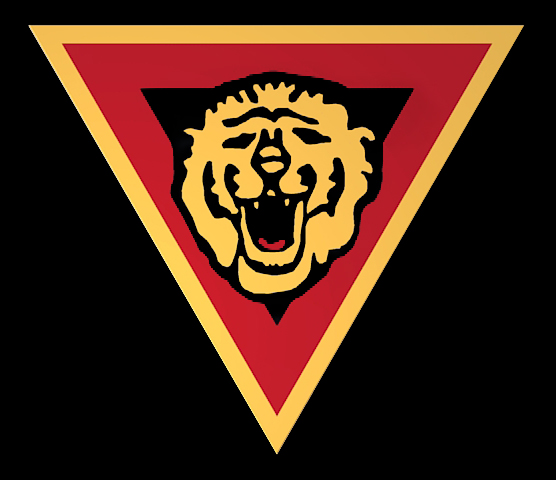
- Early insignia of the Brigade Piron
- Active: January 1943 – 17 November 1945
- Country: Belgium; Luxembourg
- Allegiance: Belgian government in exile
- Branch: Free Belgian Forces
- Type: Brigade group with motorised, artillery, reconnaissance, engineer and support elements
- Size: 2,200 officers and men
- Part of: Guards Armoured Division
- Nickname: Piron Brigade
- Engagements: World War II: Operation Paddle; Liberation of Belgium; Liberation of the Netherlands

Commanders
- Notable commanders: Jean-Baptiste Piron

Insignia
- First designation: First Group (Late 1942-January 1943)
- Second designation: First Belgian Brigade (January 1943-July 1944)
- Third designation: Independent Belgian Brigade (July 1944-November 1945)

The Independent Belgian Brigade (Dutch: 1e Infanteriebrigade ”Bevrijding”, lit. '1st Infantry Brigade "Liberation"') was a Belgian and Luxembourgish military unit in the Free Belgian forces during World War II, commonly known as the Piron Brigade (Brigade Piron) after its commanding officer Jean-Baptiste Piron. It saw action in Western Europe and participated in the Battle of Normandy, the Liberation of Belgium, and fighting in the Netherlands over 1944-1945.

== Origins ==
Brigade Piron originated in 1940, with hundreds of Belgian soldiers who had escaped to Britain, as had the Belgian Government. A new command of the Belgian Army, under Lieutenant-General Victor van Strydonck de Burkel, was created in Tenby on 25 May 1940, three days before the Belgian capitulation. Van Strydonck de Burkel became commander of the Belgian Forces in Great Britain in June 1940 and in the same month, a Belgian minister (Jaspar) called upon all Belgians to come to Britain to continue fighting.

At the end of July 1940 there were 462 men in the Belgian Forces in exile; the arrival of many Belgians allowed the creation of several military units. The troops were trained in Great Britain and Canada and in 1942, Major Jean-Baptiste Piron arrived in Scotland, where he quickly joined the army staff, with the responsibility of improving the training of Belgian troops. In an artillery competition, the Belgian battery came first. The Belgian Forces in Britain were officially made available to the Allies on 4 June 1942. By the end of the year the army had been restructured, including the creation of the 1st Belgian Brigade, under the command of Major Piron, with a mix of infantry, artillery and reconnaissance units. Troop training continued through 1943 and landing exercises were conducted in early 1944. A Luxembourgish unit was assigned to Brigade Piron in March, forming an artillery troop. In total about 116 Luxembourgers served in the unit. Because the Belgians had arrived from around the world, thirty-three languages were spoken in the brigade in 1944.

== Normandy invasion ==
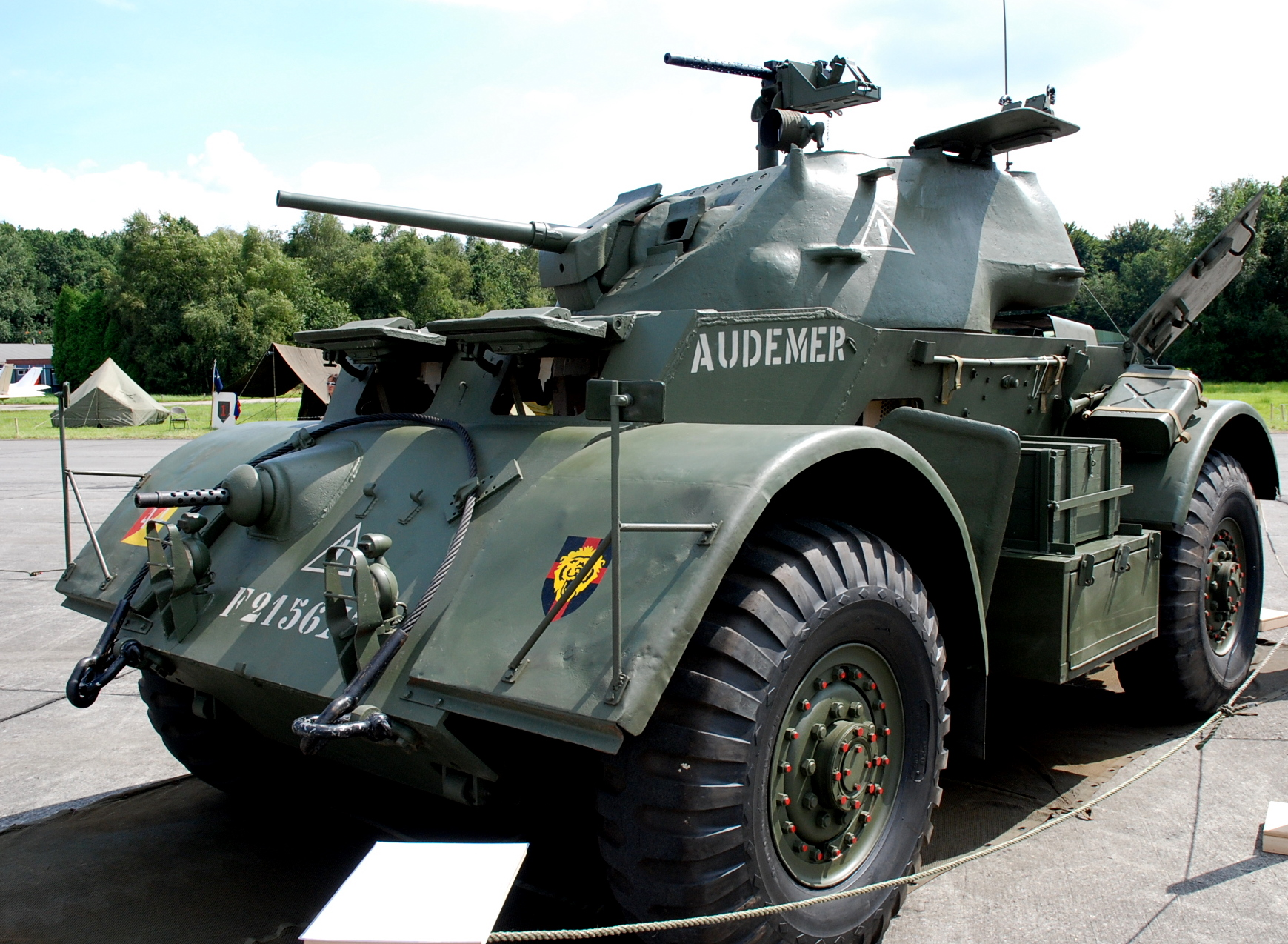
A T17 Staghound armoured car with the markings of the Brigade Piron

The D-Day landings took place on 6 June 1944 without Brigade Piron, to the great disappointment of its 2,200 men but the British preferred to reserve them for the liberation of Belgium. (This policy was applied to all of the smaller national military contingents, which were expected to form the basis of post-war armies and for whom it would have been difficult to find replacements for casualties.) Piron lobbied the Belgian government in exile, which requested the British Government to send the Belgian troops to the front, to reverse the declining morale of those troops.

On 29 July 1944, the brigade was ordered to be ready to move. Its first units arrived in Normandy on 30 July and the main body arrived at Arromanches and Courseulles on 8 August, before the end of the Battle of Normandy. The brigade operated under the command of the British 6th Airborne Division (Major General Gale), which was part of the First Canadian Army. The Belgians entered active service on 9 August.

The Belgian Brigade participated in Operation Paddle, Clearing the Channel coast from 17 August with British and Dutch (Prinses Irene Brigade) troops of the 6th Airborne Division. Merville-Franceville-Plage was liberated in the evening, Varaville on 20 August. The brigade's armoured vehicles were detached to assist British units. Dives-sur-Mer and Cabourg were taken on the morning of 21 August and Houlgate in the afternoon. The brigade took Villers-sur-Mer and Deauville on 22 August, and Trouville-sur-Mer and Honfleur at the mouth of the Seine on 24 August. The bridge connecting the communes of Deauville and Trouville-sur-Mer was renamed to "Pont des Belges" and still bears a commemoration to the brigade which liberated the communes.

The Belgian armoured vehicles were reunited with the rest of the brigade on 26 August at Foulbec. On 28 August 1944, the brigade was placed under the British 49th Infantry Division in order to mop up the Seine estuary and help in the siege of Le Havre. On 29 August, the brigade crossed the Seine to support Operation Astonia, the attack on Le Havre on the following day. At the last moment the brigade was withdrawn from the front and transferred to the Second Army for operations in Belgium. The efforts of Brigade Piron on Normandy's Côte Fleurie are commemorated by memorials, road names and war graves.

== Belgium and the Netherlands ==
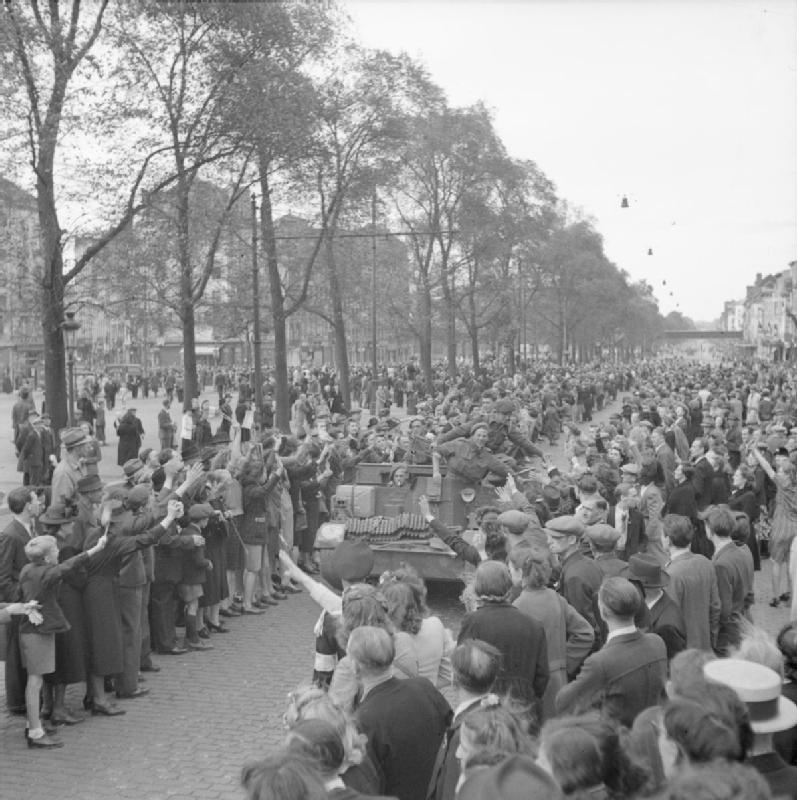
A Universal Carrier of the Brigade Piron mobbed by civilians during the Liberation of Brussels in 1944.

On 2 September, the brigade and the Dutch Princess Irene Brigade had been transferred to the Second Army and ordered to move as quickly as possible to the Belgian border. The British were already in Belgium and expected to enter Brussels on the following day and this transfer would allow the Belgian and Dutch Brigades to operate in their homelands. The brigade arrived at the French–Belgian border on 3 September, after an overnight journey and continued to Brussels the following day, just after the British.

In early September the brigade acted as guides for British soldiers, attempted to aid Resistance fighters, and took part in mine-clearing at the Evere and Melsbroek airports. The brigade entered northern Belgium on 3 September 1944,

On 11 September 1944, the brigade participated in a battle at the Albert Canal bridgehead and helped to capture Leopoldsburg liberating 900 political prisoners.

During Operation Market Garden the brigade was assigned to guard the right flank of the British 30th corps.

On 25 September 1944 the brigade reached the Wessem canal with fighting reaching its peak on 11 November 1944. Six days later the brigade was withdrawn and reorganized into a proper brigade for the first time at Leuven.

During their advance through Belgium, the Belgian troops were sometimes mistaken for French Canadians, since local people did not expect that their liberators would be fellow Belgians. Brigade Piron liberated other Belgian towns and cities before reaching the Netherlands border on 22 September. Its campaign in the Netherlands lasted until 17 November, when it was relieved from the front and moved into reserve in Leuven. In the small Dutch border town of Thorn, a bridge has been named in honour of its liberation on 25 September 1944.

Brigade Piron returned to the Netherlands between 11 April 1945 and June 1945. The last casualty of the brigade occurred on 29 April 1945. The next day, the brigade was thrown into battle once again around Nijmegen. On that day also, an armistice was implemented in the Netherlands. The brigade entered Germany in May before being disbanded in December. Its tradition was however preserved in the Bevrijding (Liberation) battalion of the 5th Regiment of the Line.

== Occupation of Germany ==
Brigade Piron occupied part of the British zone of occupation until 15 December 1945.

Brigade Piron Pictures

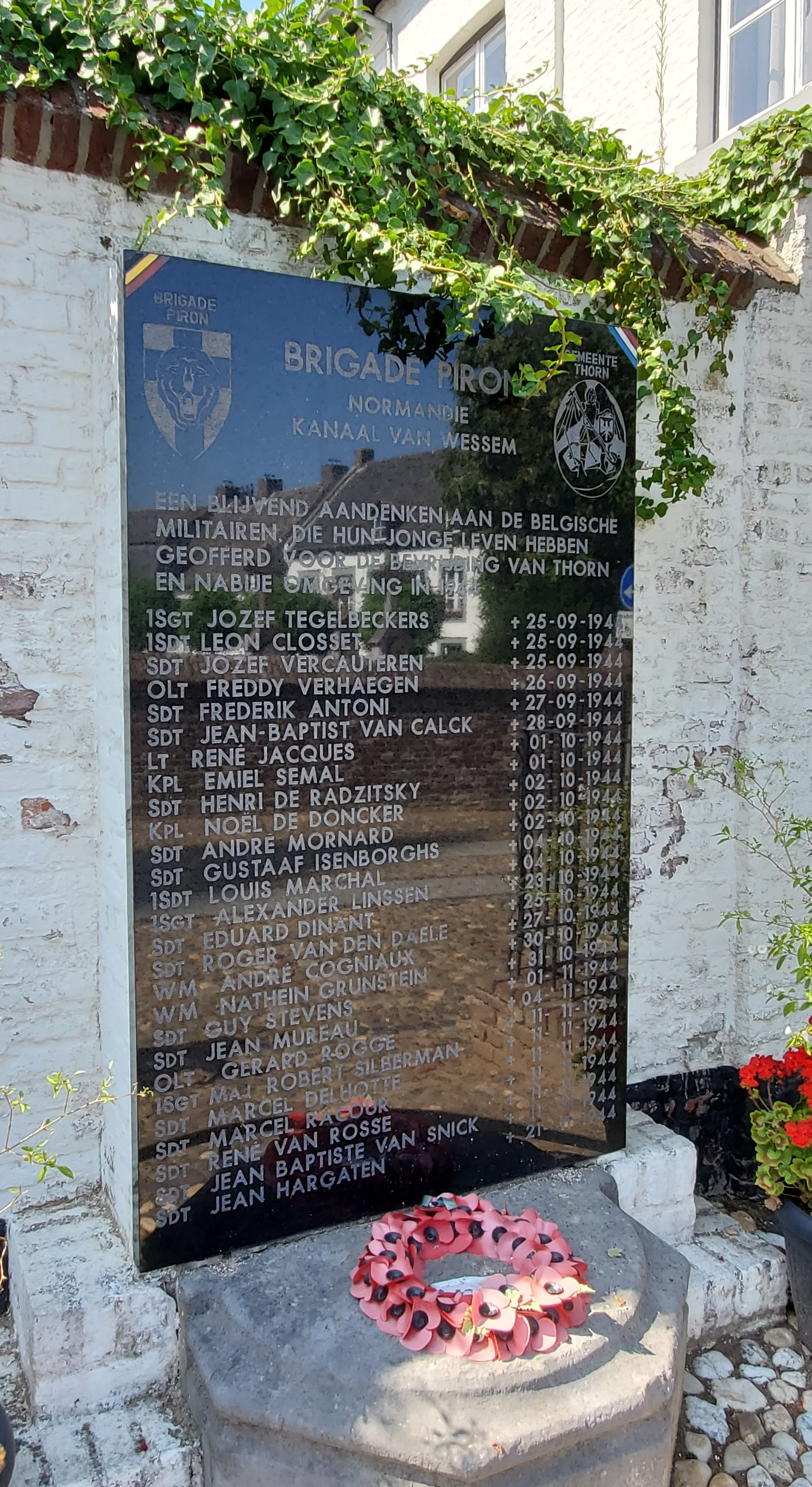
Memorial in Thorn (Limburg), The Netherlands.

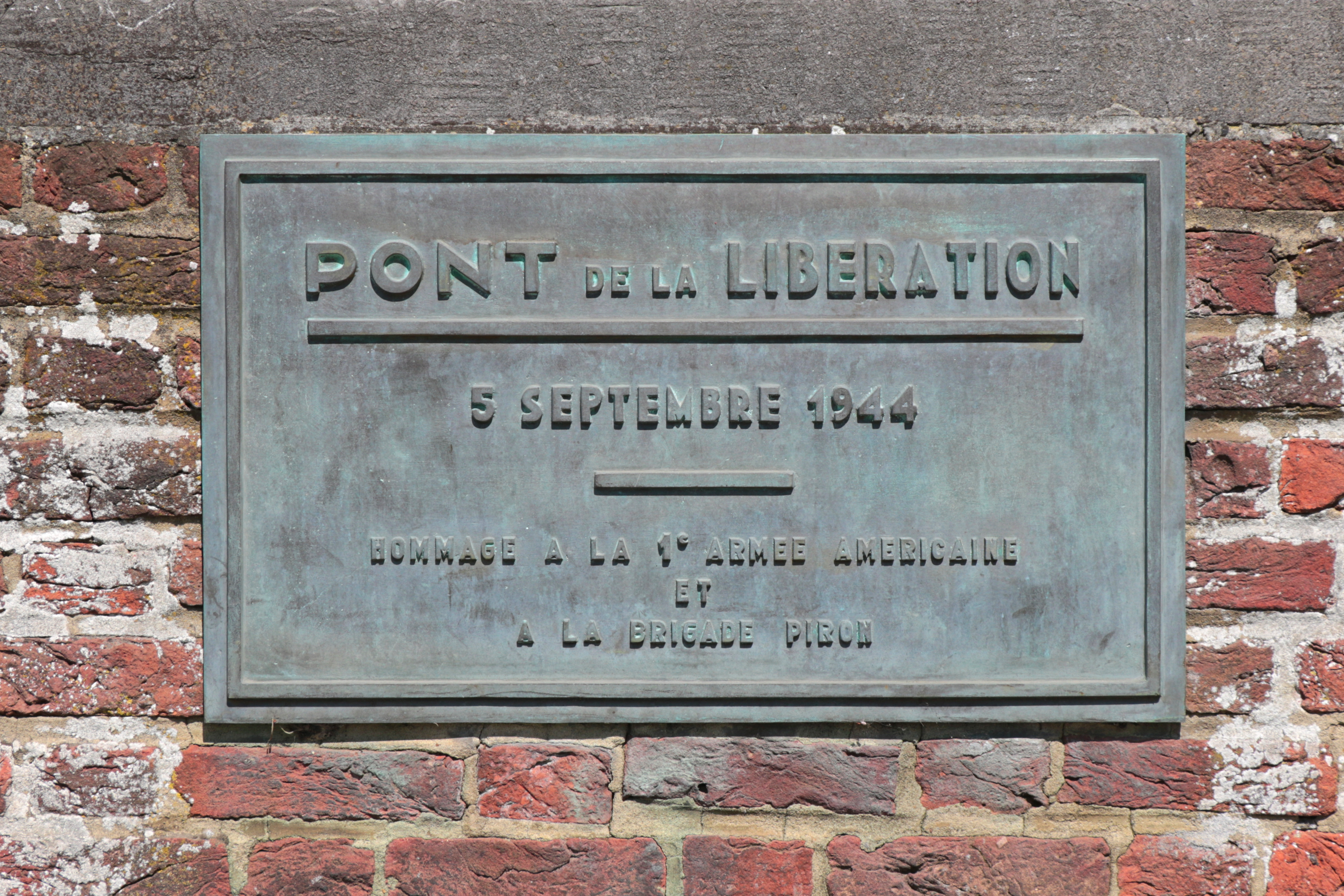
Plaque on « Liberation bridge» in Ottignies Belgium.

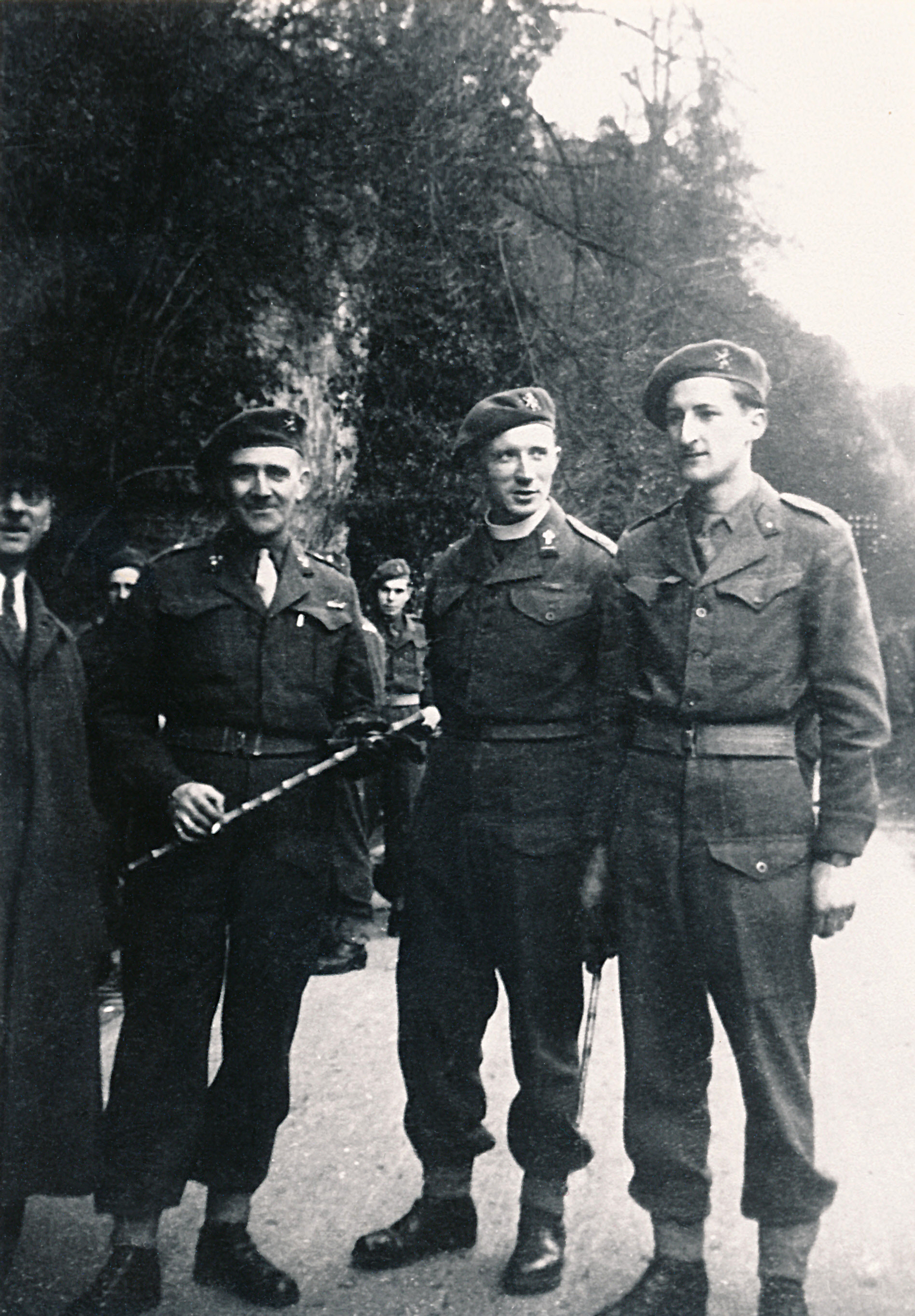
Captain, chaplain and WO of the 1st Infantry Brigade.

== Post-war ==
Brigade Piron formed the basis of the new Belgian Army. In a reorganisation on 17 November 1945, the brigade's artillery and armoured units were reorganised to form specialised regiments and the engineers joined a new engineer battalion. The remaining infantry, reinforced by volunteers, became the First Brigade Liberation, based at Leopoldsburg barracks.

== Order of battle ==
In August 1944, the 1st Belgian Brigade consisted of:

- Staff
- British Liaison
- 1st, 2nd and 3rd Motorised companies – each with rifle platoons reinforced by mortar, machine gun, anti-tank and anti-aircraft platoons.
- Armoured Car Squadron – 4 squadrons equipped with a mixture of Daimler Armoured Cars, Staghound armoured cars (some armed with anti-aircraft weapons) and Daimler "Dingo" Scout Cars and a supply and recovery squadron
- Artillery Battery – 12 25 pounder gun-howitzers, organised into 3 troops, one of which was Luxembourgish.
- Engineers Company
- Transport Company
- Repair Detachment
- Medical Unit
