= United Nations Peace Memorial Hall =

Memorial in Busan, Gyeongnam, South Korea

United Nations Peace Memorial Hall

The United Nations Peace Memorial (also, UN Peace Memorial or United Nations Peace Memorial; Korean: UN평화기념관) is a memorial in Busan, Gyeongnam, Korea. As an affiliated organisation of the Ministry of Patriots and Veterans Affairs, the United Nations Peace Memorial was established on November 11th, 2014, in order to pay respects to the soldiers of the UN Forces who sacrificed their lives to protect and defend the freedom and peace in Korea.

The Memorial features three permanent exhibitions: The Korean War Room – covering the outbreak of the war to the signing of the armistice, depicting key events such as the Busan Port (Pusan Port), Battle of the Pusan Perimeter, Incheon Operation (Operation Chromite) and the Iron Triangle (Korea).

The UN Allied Nations Room – showcasing artefacts and stories from the 16 combat support countries and 6 medical support countries, highlighting the bravery of typically young soldiers. The UN Peace Room – tracing the formation of the UN, its peacekeeping efforts, ongoing global missions, and South Korea's participation in UN peace operations. In addition to these permanent exhibitions, the Memorial also hosts special exhibitions, including themed displays.

== Founding and overview ==
The Memorial opened in 2014 and cost over 25 million won (23.9 million USD) to build. The Memorial is 5 stories and over 8336 square meters. It also contains many artifacts from the war.
