= Kumsong County =

Historical county of Korea

Kumsong County was a historical county of Korea. It was established in 1018, and merged into Kimhwa County in 1914. In July 1953, after Korean War, most of Kumsong County merged into Kimhwa County of North Korea.

== See also ==
- Cheorwon County (Korea)
- Battle of Kumsong
