= Albert Crahay =

Belgian lieutenant general

- Born: 9 June 1903; Ixelles, Brussels, Belgium
- Died: 19 October 1991 (aged 88); Saint-Cézaire-sur-Siagne, France
- Military career
- Allegiance: Belgium
- Service years: 1921–64
- Rank: Lieutenant General
- Commands: Belgian Volunteer Corps for Korea (1951); Belgian Forces in Germany (1960-64)
- Conflicts: World War II; Battle of Belgium; Korean War; Battle of the Imjin River
- Awards: Distinguished Service Cross

Lieutenant-General Baron Albert Crahay (9 June 1903 – 19 October 1991) was a Belgian soldier and historian. He is known particularly as the commander of the Belgian contingent in the Korean War and of the Belgian army of occupation in Germany.

== Career ==
Born in Ixelles, Brussels in 1903, Crahay entered the École Militaire as an artillery cadet in 1921. Graduating in 1923, he subsequently studied at the École d'Application and the École de Guerre where he gained a brevet d'état-major. He became a staff officer in 1936 and was still serving on the General Staff during the German invasion of Belgium in 1940. Crahay was held as a prisoner of war in Nazi Germany for the duration of World War II.

Returning to Belgium in 1945, Crahay took a teaching post in the military academy. In 1950, at the outbreak of the Korean War, he volunteered to serve in the first Belgian contingent and was given command of the unit. He played an important role during the Battle of the Imjin River in 1951, before handing over command at the end of the year. After Korea, Crahay returned to teaching at the military academy in Belgium. In 1958, he was given command of the 16th Armoured Division, a Belgian unit in West Germany, and, in 1960, was chosen to take overall command of the Belgian Forces in Germany. He retired in 1964 as a Lieutenant-General.

In retirement, Crahay chaired the comité interministériel de l’eau between 1969 and 1983. He wrote several memoires and books on Belgian military history and was made a baron in 1983.

== Authography ==
- Les Belges en Corée, 1951-1955 (Brussels: La Renaissance du Livre, 1966)
- L'Armée Belge entre les Deux Guerres (Brussels: Musin, 1978)
- Le roi et la défense du pays de 1831 à nos jours (Braine-L'Alleud: J.M. Collet, 1987)
- Une vie au XX^{e} siècle (Braine-L'Alleud: J.M. Collet, 1988)
- Le Général Van Overstraeten "vice-roi" en 1940 (Braine-L'Alleud: J.M. Collet, 1990)
