= Eugène De Greef =

Belgian politician

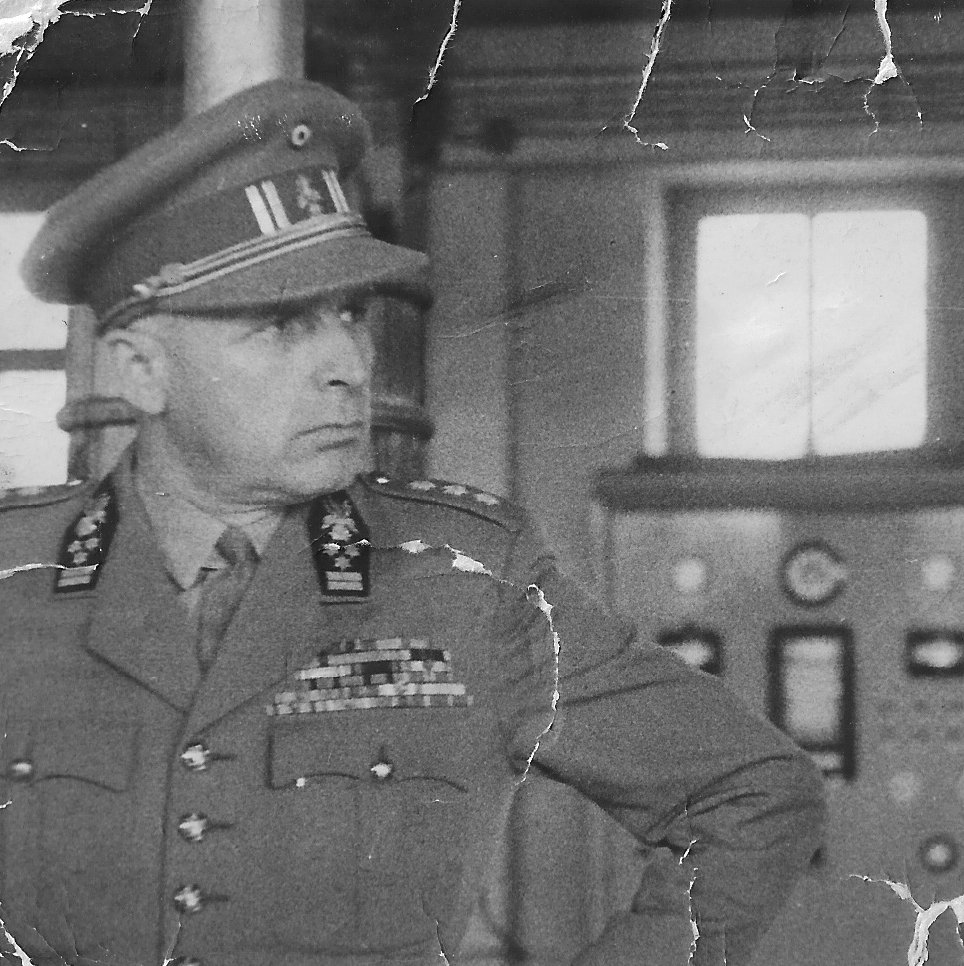

Minister of Defence
- In office 16 August 1950 – 23 April 1954
- Prime Minister: Joseph Pholien; Jean Van Houtte
- Preceded by: Henri Moreau de Melen
- Succeeded by: Antoon Spinoy

Personal details
- Born: Belgium
- Party: None (Technical expert)

Lieutenant General Eugène De Greef (31 August 1900 – 14 February 1995) was a Belgian Minister of Defence, serving under two successive Belgian prime ministers (first Pholien, then Van Houtte) between 1950 and 1954. His tenure coincided with Belgian intervention in the Korean War, as well as important negotiations about the European Defence Community.

== Background and career ==
De Greef was from a Walloon family

== De Greef and the Korean War ==
Though De Greef was not the minister who took the decision to send Belgian soldiers to the UN mission in Korea, he held office through the entire duration of the conflict.

De Greef's predecessor (Henri Moreau de Melen of the Christian Social Party) resigned his tenure early to volunteer to serve in Korea. De Greef's own son, Captain Guy de Greef (described as "a superb officer") commanded C Company of the Belgian Volunteer Corps in Korea in 1953, at the Battle of Chatkol.

== Other events ==
De Greef was involved in the negotiations of the European Defence Community and North Atlantic Treaty Organization.

Under De Greef, Belgium promised to contribute 12 soldiers out of every 1,000 inhabitants. Compulsory military training was increased to two years from one and total army strength increased to 150,000 men.
