= Belgian Forces in Germany =

Belgian Forces in Germany (FBA-BSD)
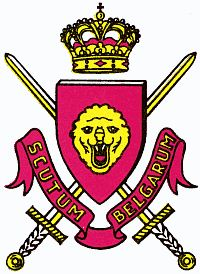
- Insignia with the badge of First Corps in the centre.
- Active: 1946–2002
- Country: Belgium
- Allegiance: NATO (after 1955)
- Branch: Belgian army
- Role: Army of occupation (1945-1955); Defense of West Germany (1955-2002)
- Size: 40,000 men (at height)
- Part of: (United Kingdom) British Army of the Rhine (NATO) Northern Army Group
- Mottos: Scutum Belgarum (lit. 'Shield of the Belgians')

Commanders
- Notable commanders: Jean-Baptiste Piron (1946–51); Albert Crahay (1960–64); Francis Briquemont (1993–96)

The Belgian Forces in Germany (French: Forces belges en Allemagne or FBA, Dutch: Belgische strijdkrachten in Duitsland, BSD) was the name of Belgium's army of occupation in West Germany after World War II. Lasting between 1946 and 2002, the army corps-strength FBA-BSD formed part of the NATO force guarding Western Europe against Warsaw Pact during the Cold War. At its height, 40,000 soldiers were serving with the unit with several thousand civilians also living in the Belgian zone around Cologne.

== History ==
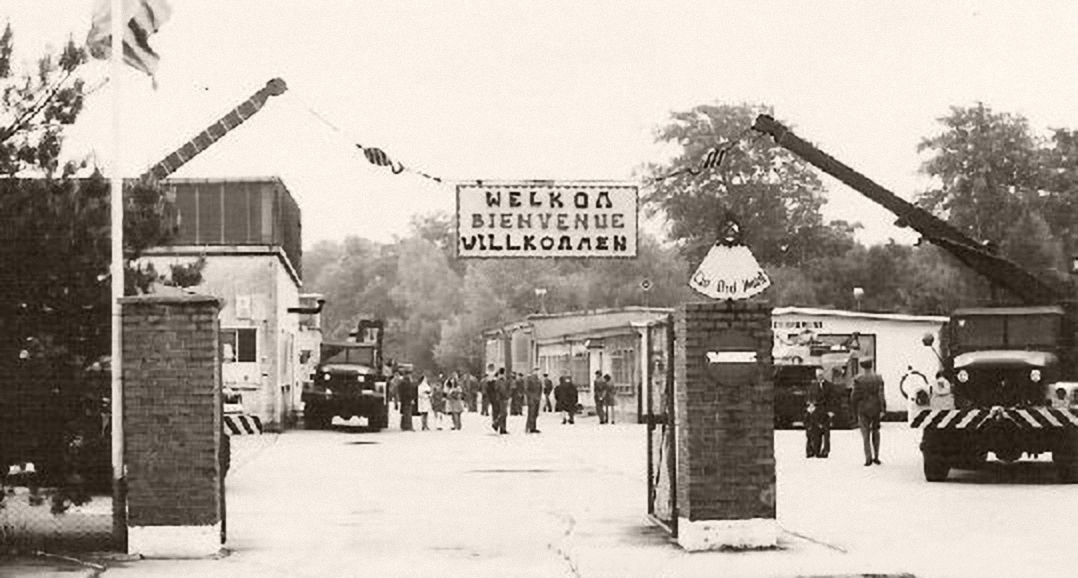
Belgian base near Eschweiler in 1969

Map of the British occupation zone in Germany showing the area of the British zone under Belgian control

In the aftermath of World War II, the Belgian Army of Occupation (Armée belge d'occupation, or ABO; Belgische Bezettingsleger, BBL) was deployed to Allied-occupied Germany alongside other forces from the former Western Allies. Belgian units were sent to the southernmost section of the British occupation zone in the region between Aachen, Cologne, Soest, Siegen, and Kassel in North Rhine-Westphalia. From 1 April 1946, there were three infantry brigades present from the Belgian Army. Headquarters were initially established in Bonn. Although allowed a limited degree of autonomy, the territory remained under the exclusive control of the British with whom relations were sometimes tense. An agreement signed in December 1949 provided more autonomy and officially recognised a "sector" for Belgian forces. After the foundation of the West Germany (May 1949), the occupation role officially came to an end with the ratification of the Bonn–Paris conventions (May 1955).

Amid the escalation of the Cold War, the strategic importance of West Germany became obvious for NATO. The Belgian Forces in Germany (Forces belges en Allemagne or FBA, Belgische strijdkrachten in Duitsland, BSD), now renamed, changed from being an "army of occupation" to being an "army of protection" guarding a 60 kilometres (37 mi)-wide strip of German territory against possible attack by the Warsaw Pact. It was assigned to NATO's Northern Army Group (NORTHAG) and Belgium enjoyed de jure equality with other NATO member states.

At its height, 40,000 Belgian soldiers were stationed in Germany and a total of 70,000 Belgian nationals lived in the Belgian sector. At the end of the Cold War in November 1989, there were still 24,000 soldiers deployed in West Germany. A large number of those who served were conscripts deployed to the force as part of their national service. The large number of Belgian citizens, both soldiers and their families, led the Belgian sector to be nicknamed the "tenth province" (dixième province) of Belgium. Over the course of the Belgian occupation, hundreds of thousands of Belgian citizens lived in the area with their families and various civilian institutions such as schools were established. Plans for the evacuation of families in event of war were also drawn up.

At the end of the Cold War, the Belgian government launched a plan to restructure the entire Belgian Army between 2000 and 2015. Belgian troops began a period of staged withdrawal designed "Reforbel". The final Belgian barracks (Troisdorf-Spich) was shut on 31 August 2004. Some soldiers remained in Vogelsang Camp, across the frontier, until 2005. 450 "mixed" Belgian-German families opted to remain in Germany after the military withdrawal.

Today a museum in Soest, Germany is dedicated to the history of the FBA-BSD. The Royal Museum of the Armed Forces in Brussels held a temporary exhibition on the subject, entitled "Belgian soldiers in Germany, 1945–2002", in 2011.

== Structure ==
The I (Belgian) Corps was initially based in Cologne and included, from 1951:

- 1st Infantry Division
- 16th Armoured Division
- 4th Infantry Division

The latter remained in Belgium but was officially disbanded in 1960. It was also assigned on a war footing the 2nd and 3rd Infantry Divisions from 1952.

== See also ==
- Belgium in World War II
- Belgian United Nations Command (1950–55)
- European Defence Community (1950–52)
