= Battle of Haktang-ni =

1951 battle of the Korean War

Coordinates: 38.339°N 127.255°E

- Part of the Korean War
Date	9–13 October 1951
Location	Hill 391, between Cheorwon and Pyonggang, Korea
Result	Stalemate

Belligerents
United Nations: Belgium; Luxembourg (Note: The 1st Luxembourg Detachment (previously part of A Company) under Lt. Joseph Wagener had returned home in September 1951 and the 2nd detachment only arrived on 16 March 1952. However, six Luxembourg soldiers re-enlisted for a second tour of duty in Korea and were part of the Belgian units during the battle.); United States	China

Commanders and leaders
(United States) Robert Soule (Belgium) Norbert Cools (Belgium) Georges Vivario	(China) Ye Jianmin

Units involved
Belgium–Luxembourg Battalion	(China) 141st Division

Strength
560	Several battalions

Casualties and losses
10 killed 14 wounded	98 killed and wounded 4 captured
- Location within North Korea

The Battle of Haktang-ni was a skirmish in which elements of the People's Volunteer Army attacked an advanced position held by the Belgium–Luxembourg Battalion along a ridge-line known as "Broken Arrow" or "Broken Arrow Hill" (Hill 391) between 9 and 13 October 1951.

== Background ==
Haktang-ni (Korean: 학당리, Hakdang-ri) is an isolated ridge about 1,500 meters long, extending from north to south and dominating the surrounding plain for hundreds of metres in each direction. It is rocky and entirely clear of cover. At the northern extremity of the hill is the steepest and highest point of the hill, the centre section plateaus before a very steep rocky outcrop to the extreme south. It was labeled Hill 391 by the US Army while the South Korean Institute for Military History's official history called it Hill 388.

== Battle ==
=== 10 October 1951: Belgian contingent arrives at Haktang-ni ===
Belgian command tent at Haktang-ni. It would be briefly overrun by Chinese troops during the main assault on the 13th

At 14:00 on 10 October 1951, the Belgian-Luxembourg Battalion arrived at Haktang-ni -- 4 miles (6.4 km) in front of other UN positions held by the US 65th Infantry Regiment -- in the no-man's land between UN and PVA lines, and dug in. C Company dug in at the northern peak, while B Company entrenched in the northern section of the central plateau. The 40-men-strong Heavy Weapons Company, equipped with American supplied .30 Machine Guns and 75 mm guns took up position on the southern peak 300–400 metres away from the rest of the battalion to prevent it being used as a base for mortar attacks by the PVA.

The Belgian Contingent was badly under-strength at the time of the battle (comprising only 560 men instead of the usual 900) since the battle occurred in the middle of a troop rotation in which many soldiers who had been in Korea since February 1951 (including a Luxembourg detachment, which formed part of A Company) had returned home in September 1951 – and reinforcements had not arrived.

=== 10–11 October: Chinese artillery attack ===
Almost immediately from their arrival at Haktang-ni, Belgian forces came under fire from artillery fire from PVA 76mm guns and mortar fire. One Belgian soldier was killed, several were wounded. In the evening of 10 October, the first PVA patrols attacked the positions of B Company. Recognising the importance of holding the position, the US 3rd Infantry Division commander Major General Robert H. Soule visited the positions at Haktang-ni by helicopter.

As evening fell on the night of 11 October, the Belgians again came under fire – this time from PVA 60mm mortars from neighbouring Hill 317.

=== 12 October 1951: Start of the battle ===
In the early morning of 12 October 1951 several small-scale PVA assaults were repelled. First, at 03:45 a PVA patrol, supported by machine gun fire, attacked the Heavy Weapons Company. It was eventually driven back by US artillery fire from 105 mm and 155 mm artillery. One Belgian soldier was killed during this assault with six soldiers wounded of whom two were Korean soldiers attached to the Belgian Battalion.

Later that day, from 08:00 to 15:00, patrols from B Company, climbed nearby Palli-Bong Hill (Hill 488) which was being used as an observation post by PVA forces. A second patrol from the Reconnaissance Platoon reached nearby Hill 317 found a PVA ammunition dump, which they destroyed, and then returned to Haktang-ni. During the day, numerous squads of 5–10 PVA soldiers had infiltrated behind the Belgian lines. The thick fog that had covered the battlefield during the day dispersed at 23:30 at the same moment as the main PVA assault began on the Heavy Weapons Company.

=== Morning of 13 October 1951: Main PVA assault ===
Soldiers from Chinese 141st Division during Operations Commando and Polecharge.

The main PVA attack on the Heavy Weapons Company began at 23:30 on 12 October. It opened along the front line of the Reconnaissance Platoon where PVA troops advanced in perfect silence, moving through the barbed wire, when they came under fire from machine guns and flamethrowers. The attack on B Company and the Heavy Weapons Company came under attack. PVA troops managed to occupy the position used by the HQ of the Belgian battalion. At 02:00, the PVA assault on the Heavy Weapons Company renewed, but by 04:00 these main attacks had been repulsed and all positions had been re-occupied. At daybreak, Hill 317 was re-occupied by Belgian troops, and a reconnaissance patrol from C Company came under machine gun and mortar fire from Palli-Bong hill.

During the night, the bodies of many wounded and dead PVA soldiers were recovered by their comrades. Indeed, only 4 wounded PVA soldiers remained on the battlefield at daybreak. They were taken prisoner by the Belgians.

== Aftermath ==
On orders from General Soule, the Belgians withdrew from positions back to the UN lines, taking up positions on Hill 362. Withdrawing from Haktang-ni, the Belgians watched a heavy artillery barrage falling on their vacated positions.

The Belgian Battalion was awarded the citation of "HAKTANG-NI" on the flag of the unit which now held by the 3rd Parachute Battalion of the Belgian Army. A "Haktang-ni" bar was added to the campaign medals of those who served at the battle.

== See also ==
- Battle of Chatkol
- Battle of Arrowhead Hill
- Battle of White Horse Hill

== Notes ==
Footnotes

Citations

Bibliography

- Chinese Military Science Academy (2000). History of War to Resist America and Aid Korea (抗美援朝战争史) (in Chinese). Vol. III. Beijing: Chinese Military Science Academy Publishing House. ISBN 7-80137-394-4.
- Crahay, Albert (1985). Bérets Bruns en Corée 1950–1953. Vécu Par Des Belges (in French). Brussels: Collet. OCLC 165584223.
- Hu, Guang Zheng (胡光正); Ma, Shan Ying (马善营) (1987). Chinese People's Volunteer Army Order of Battle (中国人民志愿军序列) (in Chinese). Beijing: Chinese People's Liberation Army Publishing House. OCLC 298945765.
