= Francis Briquemont =

Belgian lieutenant general

Francis Briquemont (born 1935) is a Belgian lieutenant general who during the Bosnian War served as head of the UNPROFOR mission in Sarajevo (12 July 1993 – 24 January 1994).

Briquemont had already commanded at the brigade and division levels in units earmarked for NATO and was slated to become commander of the I. Belgian Corps stationed in Germany, when he went to Bosnia.

In January 1994 Briquemont resigned disillusioned over the UN’s inaction and inability, complaining over the enormous gap between the UN resolutions, the (un)willingness to enforce them and the insufficient means given to the UN theatre commanders. In 1994 he returned to his command of I Belgian Corps.
