= Battle of Chatkol =

1953 battle of the Korean War

- Part of the Korean War
Date	26 February – 21 April 1953
Location	"Iron Triangle"; North-South Korean border
Result	United Nations victory

Belligerents
United Nations: Belgium; Luxembourg (Note: As at the Battle of Haktang-ni in October 1951, the Battle of Chatkol coincided with a period of troop rotation in the Luxembourg detachment. The majority of the soldiers in the Second Luxembourg Detachment returned home by ship in January 1953, arriving in March. However, several Luxembourg soldiers (including Cpl. Beringer, who would distinguish himself during the action at Chatkol) remained in Korea after the end of their official tour, included in Belgian units. Their flag is thus included for completeness, even though there was (strictly speaking) no Luxembourg unit present.); United States	China

Commanders and leaders
(United States) Maj. Gen. G. Smythe (Belgium) Lt. Col. R. Gathy	Unknown

Units involved
(United States) 3rd Infantry Division: (Belgium) Belgian Battalion	Unknown

Strength
One infantry battalion	Various (from small groups, to battalion or regimental level)

Casualties and losses
24 killed 18+ wounded 2 missing in action	Unknown

The Battle of Chatkol (also known as the 55 Nights of Chatkol) was the name given to the series of skirmishes in early 1953 between United Nations Command (UN) and Chinese People's Volunteer Army (PVA) forces near the village of Chatkol at the centre of the Iron Triangle during the Korean War. The position was held by the Belgian UN contingent for 55 consecutive nights, during which time they came under heavy attack.

== Chatkol ==
The small village of Chatkol (Korean: 잣골, sometimes "Chat-kol") lay in the centre of the zone known as the Iron Triangle between Chorwon and Kumhwa in the south, and Pyonggang in the north. specifically, Cheorwon County, Geunbuk-myeonl, Backdeok-ri (38°-19′-39.7″N / 127°-24′-13.0″E)

Chatkol was viewed as a decisive communications hub by both the UN and PVA owing to its proximity to the railway running north-east through the triangle.

== Defences around Chatkol ==
The villages of Chatkol and Sandong-ni were surrounded from the north to east by an arc of defensive fortifications known as the "boomerang" on the White Horse Mountain Range hill line On the northern portion of the defensive line, there were three outposts named (from left to right) Alice, Barbara, and Carol. The first letter of each outpost denoted which company of the Belgian contingent was responsible for their defence, while the heavy weapons company defended the eastern arc of the "boomerang." The Belgian command post was established at Sandong-ni to the north-west of the trench line.

Each outpost was manned by as few as three men during the day, but at night—the preferred time for PVA assaults—this could be increased to over ten men. Both the main positions, and the outposts themselves, were heavily built and easily defensible, incorporating bunkers and trench lines.

In the east, the Belgian positions bordered the Republic of Korea Army 9th Infantry Division.

== 8–9 March: retaking Outpost Carol ==
Outpost Carol was at a vulnerable point on the far right of the northern sector of the defences, 200 meters in front of the Belgian front line. Carol had been manned by seven soldiers and two machine guns when it was overrun by over 100 PVA soldiers. The Belgians could not react to the loss of the outpost immediately as they came under heavy and accurate artillery fire from nearby PVA positions.

The next morning, at 06:45 and with US artillery support and smoke screen, Belgian soldiers successfully assaulted and re-took the position. In this action five Belgians were killed and 17 wounded while PVA losses were estimated at 25 killed, 40 wounded.

== 13 March: retaking Outpost Alice ==
Outpost Alice was attacked at 00:15, first by an artillery bombardment, then by a massed PVA infantry attack. Retreating to their lines under fire, one soldier from the original garrison was found to be missing. When Alice was retaken, patrols were sent out to find the missing soldier. By 06:00, a wounded soldier, the survivor of Outpost Alice, was seen crawling towards the front line and was evacuated to a MASH hospital by helicopter.

== 7–8 April ==
Realizing that a PVA breakthrough was a distinct possibility, Corporal Raymond Beringer of the Luxembourg Platoon, A Company moved his .30 caliber machine gun to the roof of his bunker to enable a broader field of fire. After the battle, the bodies of over 20 PVA soldiers were found within 200 meters of his bunker. For this action, Cpl. Beringer was awarded the American Bronze Star and recommended for the Silver Star. Despite this, the paperwork containing the recommendations for both medals were lost and the award was only made in 1992.

== 18-19 April ==
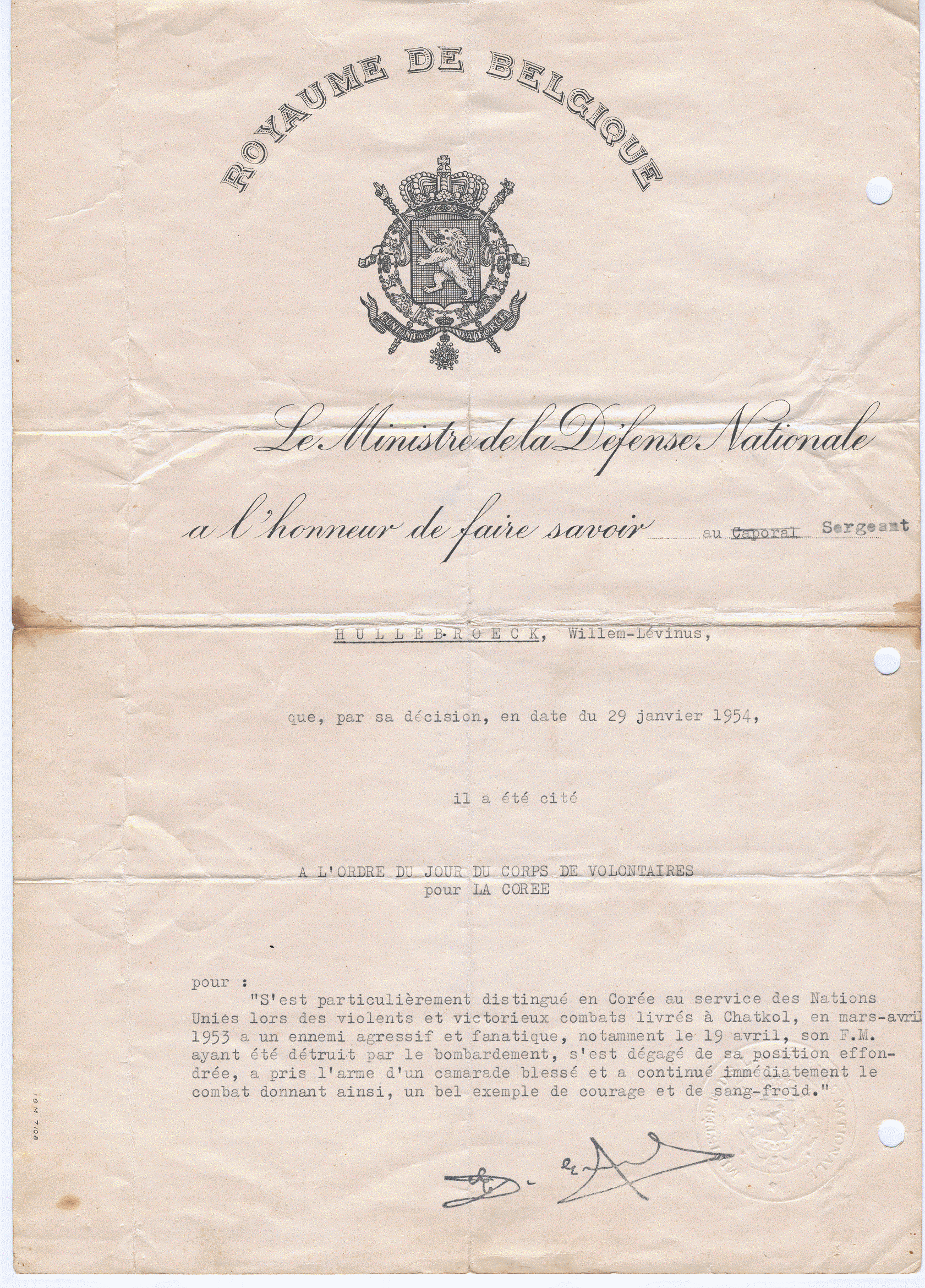
Order of the Day - W. Hullebroeck

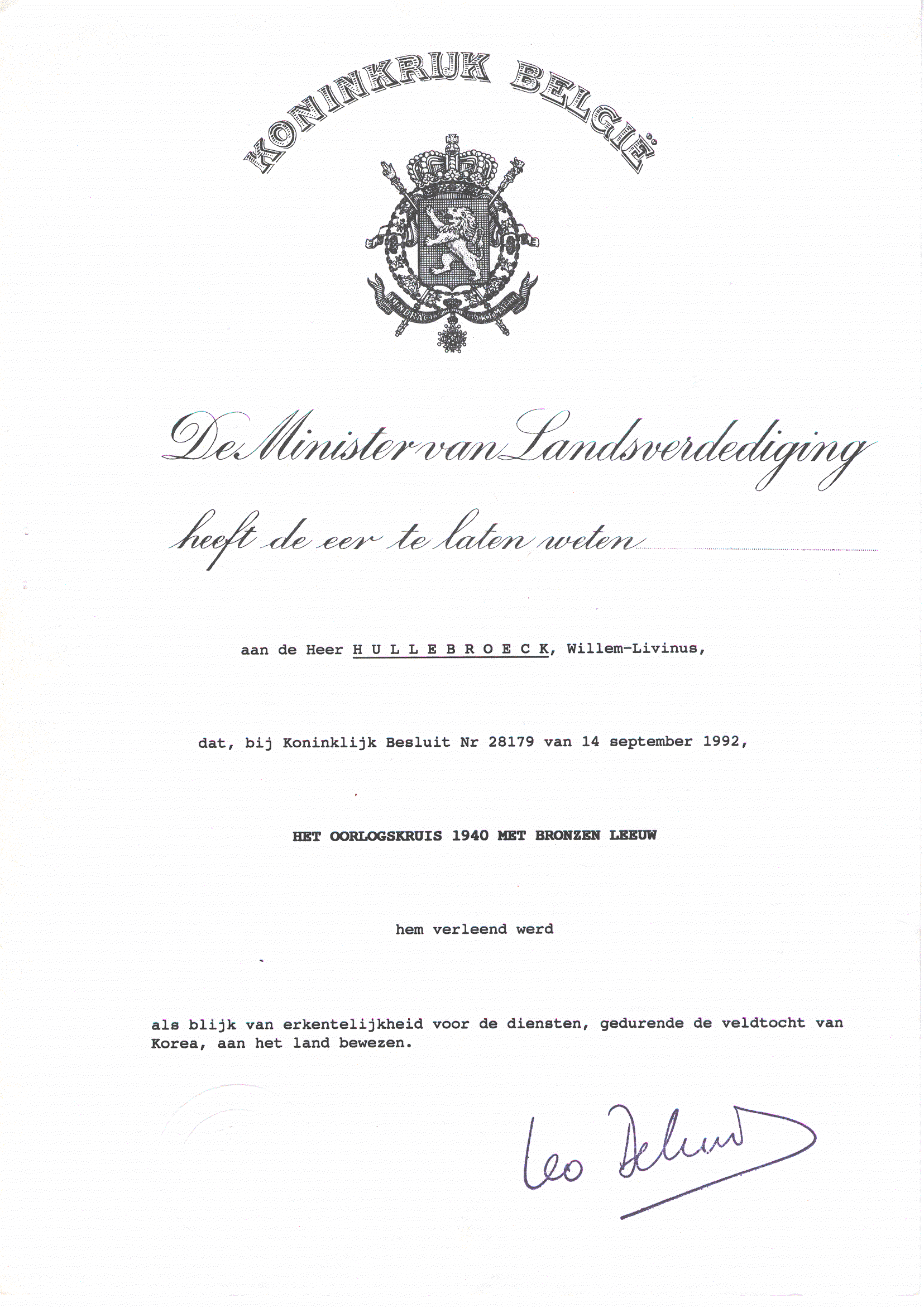
Belgian War Cross

The B Company was attacked, and bombardment destroyed the machine gun and position of Sgt. Willem Hullebroeck. He left his collapsed position to take the weapon of a wounded comrade and immediately resumed fighting. The assault that night was unsuccessful. For this act he was awarded the Order of the Day and the Belgian War Cross.
