= Bataljon Bevrijding – 5 Linie =

- Active: June 27, 1992
- Country: Belgium
- Branch: Belgian Army
- Type: Infantry
- Role: motorized infantry
- Size: 450 soldiers
- Part of: Motorized Brigade
- Garrison/HQ: Leopoldsburg

The Battalion Bevrijding – 5 Linie (lit. 'Liberation—5th Line Battalion') is an infantry battalion in the Belgian Army of the Belgian Armed Forces. The regiment is a part of the Motorized Brigade, is Dutch-speaking and is stationed at Lieutenant General Piron Barracks in Leopoldsburg.

== Battle honours ==
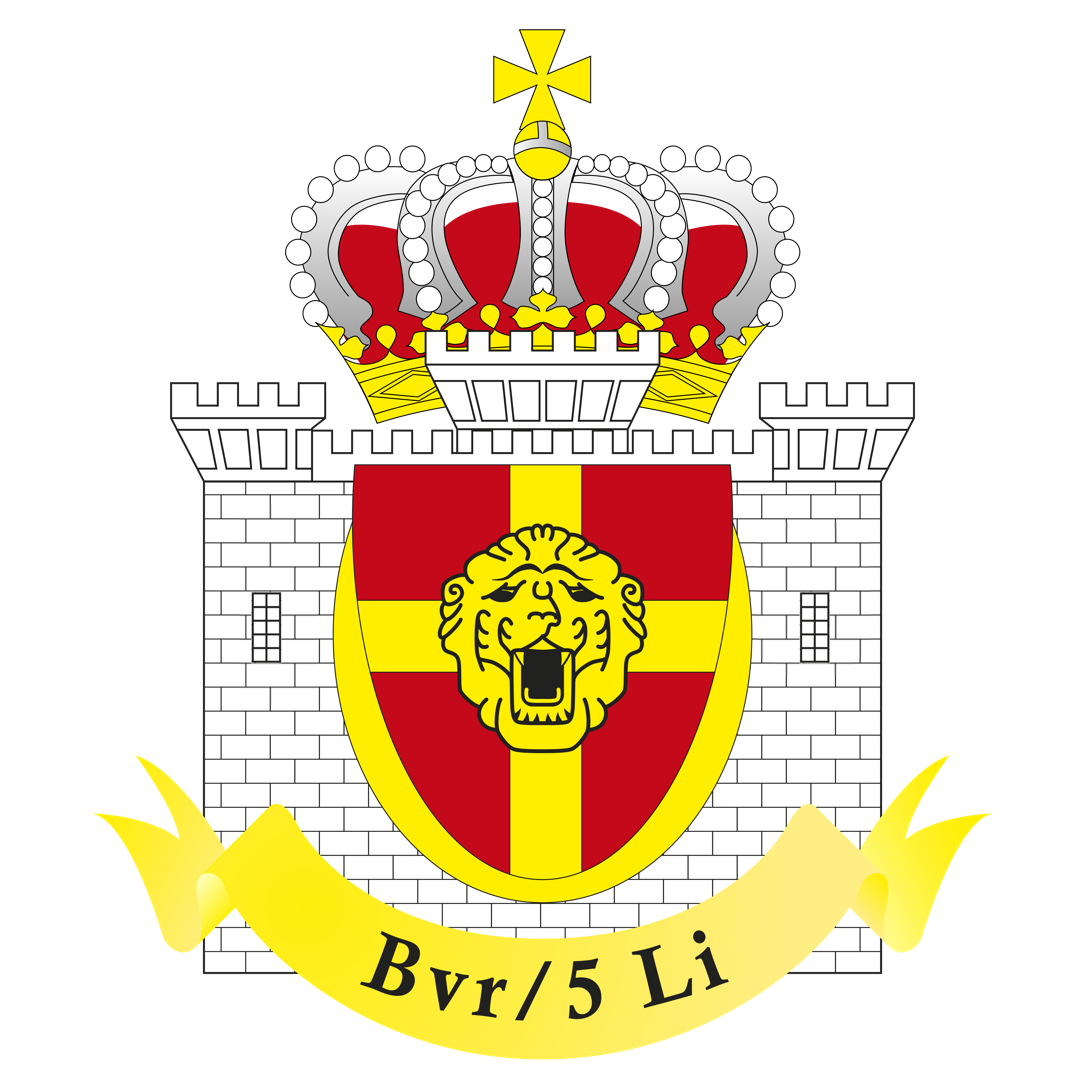
This is the official insignia of the unit

The Regiment Bevrijding – 5 Linie received the following battle honours:

- Campaign 1914-1918
- Antwerp
- Lombardsijde
- Yser/Oostrozebeke
- Normandy
- Wessem-Nederweert Canal

== Organisation ==
The battalion consists of approximately 450 personnel, organized into five companies:

- Staff and Services Company

This company includes the traditional support elements such as transport, communications, and logistics. It is also responsible for the regional basic training of new soldiers.

- Maneuver Companies

The battalion has two maneuver companies, currently equipped with MOWAG Piranha IIIC armored vehicles. Starting in 2025, these vehicles will be gradually replaced by the French Griffon armored personnel carrier.

- Support Company

The support company contains specialized teams, including snipers, reconnaissance elements, heavy weapons sections, and UAV operators.

- Operational Reserve Company (COR)

The COR is a recently established company composed of reservists who have completed operational training. These reservists can be deployed in a variety of national and international scenarios.

== Roles and Deployment ==
The Battalion Bevrijding – 5 Linie is a motorized infantry battalion capable of worldwide deployment in diverse operational environments. The unit is equipped with modern armored vehicles and trains regularly to maintain flexibility and readiness for a wide range of security challenges.

The battalion can be deployed for:

- Armed military operations on national territory
- Evacuation of Belgian citizens from crisis areas
- International humanitarian assistance
- Peace support operations under NATO or United Nations mandate
- Collective defense within NATO or the European Union
- Assistance to civil authorities during disasters or emergencies

== Capabilities ==
The battalion emphasizes rapid and mobile deployment using motorized and armored platforms. The combination of infantry soldiers, armored vehicles, and specialized weapon systems enables the unit to conduct a broad spectrum of missions. Its capabilities include:

- Fire support and heavy weapons
- Intelligence gathering
- Reconnaissance missions
- Combined arms operations

== Sources ==
- "Regiment Bevrijding - 5 Linie" (in Dutch). Defence Belgium.
- "Regiment Bevrijding - 5 Linie" (in French). Defence Belgium. Archived from the original on 2011-05-24.
- https://www.bevrijding-5linie.be
