= National Museum of Military History (Luxembourg) =

National Museum of Military History (MNHM)
- Musée national d'histoire militaire Nationalen Museum für Militärgeschichte
- A diorama at the museum displaying an assault across the Sauer by American soldiers during the Battle of the Bulge.

- Location within Luxembourg
- Established: 1984
- Location: Diekirch, Luxembourg
- Coordinates: 49.871023°N 6.159048°E
- Type: Military museum
- Curator: Benoît Niederkorn
- Website: www.mnhm.net/mnhm/

The National Museum of Military History (Luxembourgish: Nationale Militärgeschichtsmusée, French: Musée national d'histoire militaire, German: Nationales Museum für Militärgeschichte), abbreviated to MNHM, is a national museum in Diekirch, in north-eastern Luxembourg, that includes amongst its exhibits military vehicles and weaponry, a photographic archive, and lifesize dioramas displaying military servicemen and actions.

== Museum ==
The museum originally developed out of the Diekirch Historical Museum (opened in 1984), which was primarily dedicated to the Battle of the Bulge in Luxembourg in winter 1944–45. The museum is located in the complex of the Diekirch 'old brewery', 200m from the town center.

The main topic of the museum remains the balanced and objective historical representation of the military operations in the Ardennes from the American, German, and civilian points of view. Over 3000 square metres of exhibition space and numerous lifesize dioramas enable an insight of the dramatic and tragic situations that both soldiers and civilians were caught in. Special showrooms feature extensive collections of weapons, uniforms, military equipment of all kind, wheeled and tracked vehicles, in addition to numerous personal soldiers' belongings, photographs, documents, and maps. The museum's core piece is the detailed mock-up of the night-time Sauer river crossing at Diekirch on January 18, 1945 by units of the United States 5th Infantry Division. The museum's World War II collection is regarded as one of the finest of Western Europe.

A second part of the MNHM museum is dedicated to the history of the military of Luxembourg since the creation of Luxembourg as a state, until present. A number of large-scale dioramas cover key aspects and periods of the Luxembourgish army since the Second World War. Other sections are dedicated to Luxembourgers fighting in allied armies in the First World War, the Second World War, and during the Korean War. United Nations missions in which Luxembourg has participated are also covered and special displays provide an overview of daily military life.

The National Museum of Military History is a founding member of the Belgian-Luxembourg Association of the Museums of the Battle of the Ardennes (AMBA) and a European partner of the National World War II Museum in New Orleans, in the United States.

== Gallery ==
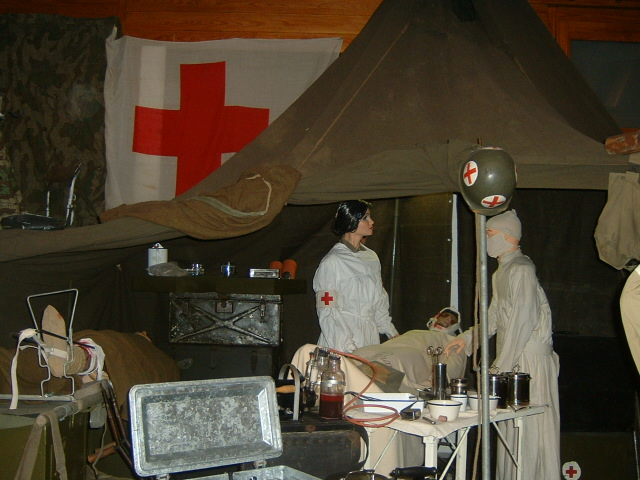
US - First Aid

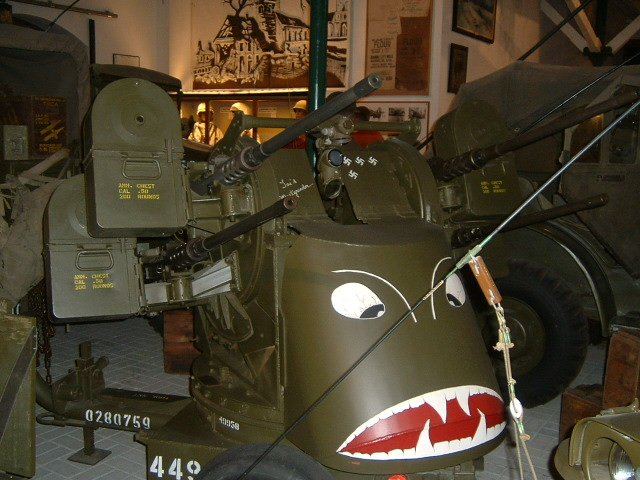
US - AA gun

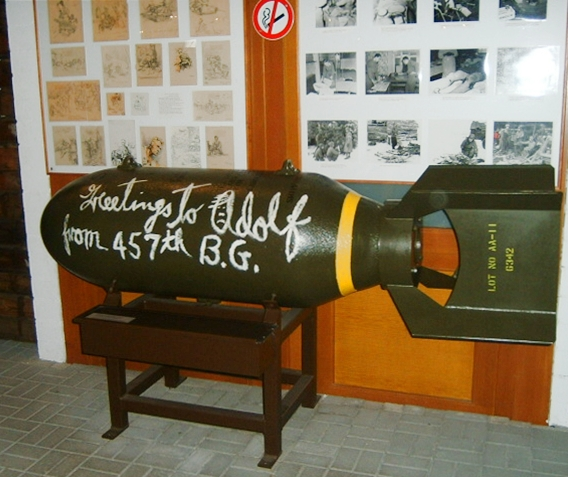
US - Bomb

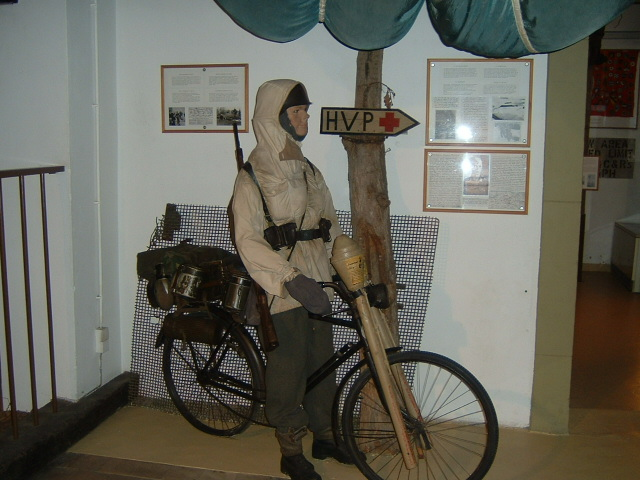
Courier with Panzerfaust

== See also ==
- List of museums in Luxembourg
