= Brevet d'état-major =

Military distinction in France and Belgium

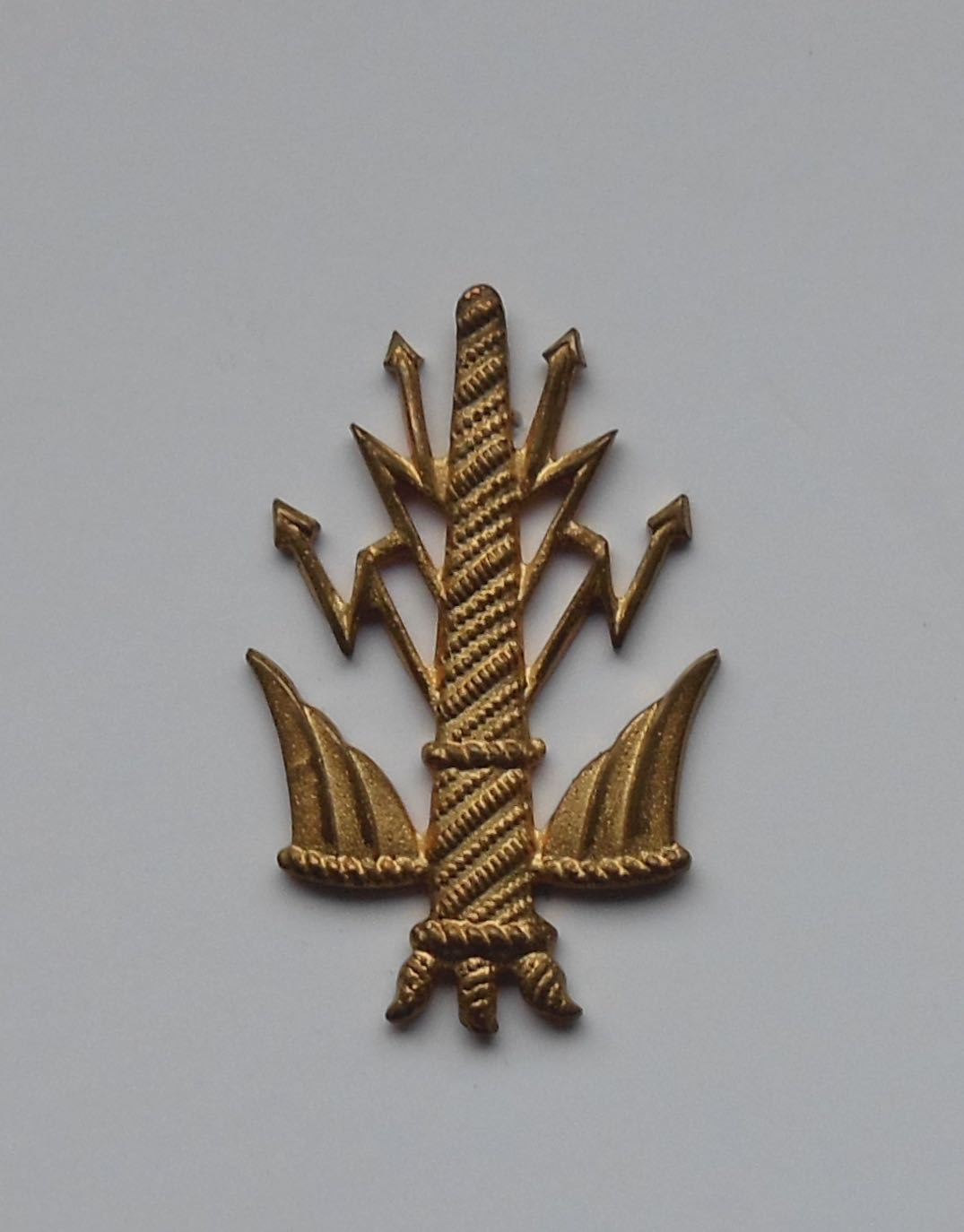
An example of the insignia worn by Belgian recipients of the BEM

A brevet d'état-major (French) or stafbrevet (Dutch), both literally "general staff brevet", is a form of military distinction in France and Belgium which denotes that an officer has completed a course at a military academy. A recipient is entitled to have breveté d'état-major (BEM) or stafbrevethouder (SBH) used as part of their formal title after their military rank, for example "Colonel BEM Émile Gilbert".

In France, the distinction was awarded between 1870 and 1940 after passing a course at the École Supérieure de Guerre.

A BEM was awarded for studying a one-year course known as a "Cycle d'études supérieures d'état-major" at the École de Guerre in Brussels, however, this was changed to a much more lengthy course and its bestowal only after being considered by a military panel.
