= Cheorwon County (Korea) =

Historical county of Korea

Cheorwon County was a historical county of Korea.

In 1895, Cheorwon County reorganized into Chuncheon, then reorganized into Gangwon Province the following year. In 1945, it was reorganized by the Soviet Civil Administration. In July 1953, after the Korean War, Cheorwon was divided into two counties: Cheorwon County of South Korea and Chorwon County of North Korea.

== See also ==
- Kimhwa County (Korea)
- Kumsong County
