= Kimhwa County (Korea) =

Historical county in Korea

Kimhwa County was a historical county of Korea that lies on the border of modern-day South and North Korea.

Kimhwa County reorganized in Chuncheon in 1895, then in Gangwon Province the following year. Kumsong County merged into Kimhwa County in 1914. North Korea abolished Kimhwa County in 1952. In July 1953, after the Korean War, most of the original Kimhwa County became part of South Korea. Both North and South Korea restored the country in 1954. In 1962, the Kimhwa County of South Korea was merged to Cheolwon County.

After a reform in 2001, most of the original (pre-1914) Kimhwa County in North Korea was annexed to Pyonggang County.

== See also ==
- Cheorwon County (Korea)
