= Christopher Buckley =

Christopher or Chris Buckley may refer to:

- Christopher Buckley (novelist) (born 1952), American political satirist
- Christopher Buckley (poet) (born 1948), American poet
- Christopher Buckley (journalist) (1905–1950), British journalist and historian
- Chris Buckley (footballer) (1886–1973), English football player
- Christopher Augustine Buckley (1845–1922), American political boss
