= A. R. Poduval =

Indian surgeon and artist

Ambadi Rama Poduval
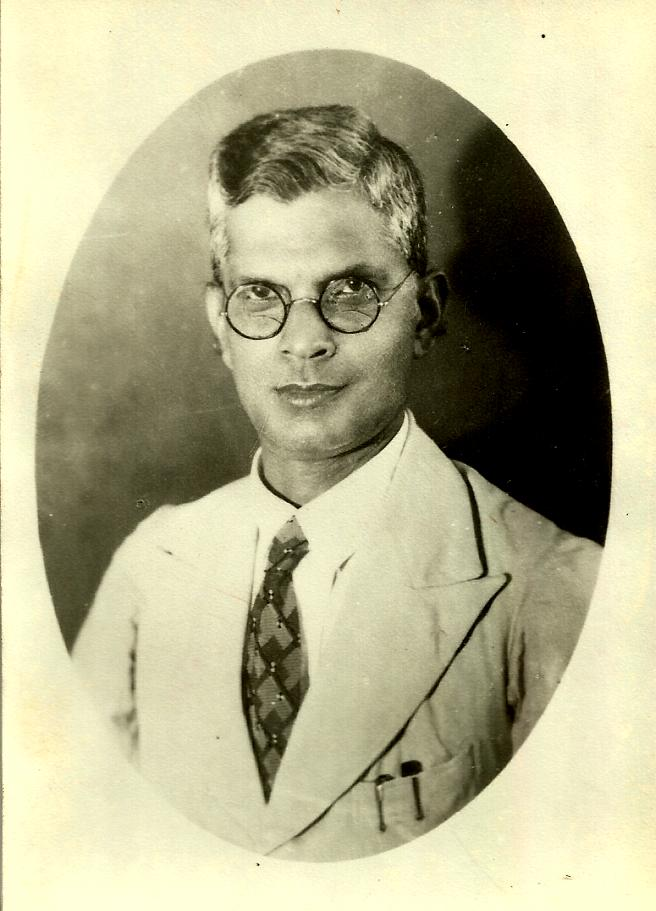
- Born: 27 January 1884; Thrissur, British India
- Died: 1940 (aged 55–56)
- Occupations: Physician, surgeon and painter

Ambadi Rama Poduval (1884–1940) was a surgeon and artist who was born in Thrissur, British India, on 27 January 1884. He matriculated from the CMS High School, Thrissur in 1899 and did the FA Course in the Maharaja's College, Ernakulam and graduated from the Presidency College, Madras in 1903. He received a Bachelor of Medicine and Master of Surgery in 1912 from the Madras Medical College and then joined the Cochin Government Service. While in service he went to England to study medicine.

During World War I Poduval was recruited in England for war service and went to Mesopotamia and Burma as an army doctor. In recognition of his war service he was appointed as Captain and was reinstated in the Cochin Government Service. He went to Germany in 1928 to take his MD Degree from the University of Hamburg. Returning from Germany, Poduval continued as Civil Surgeon, mostly in Thrissur and Ernakulam. He retired from the service as Director of Public Health, in 1939.

Shortly after retirement, Poduval died at the age of 56, after a brief illness at his house "Umaramam" in Trichur. It was the famous Malayalam poet Vallathole who gave the name for his newly built house. He was also the founder president of the Indian Medical Association, Trichur.

== Artistry ==
Even as a young boy, Poduval had shown extra ordinary talent in art and wanted to take art as a profession. It was while he was a student in Madras that he came to develop a close acquaintance with the great master of Indian art, the late Raja Ravi Varma. In a letter written in 1904, Varma recommended Poduval for a state scholarship to study art in Europe. Varma, on seeing his art collections wrote "Considering that he had been engaged till recently in his university studies, devoting only his leisure hours to drawing, the progress he has made in it seems to be remarkable. Now that he has passed his BA examination, his object seems to be to take art as a profession – a very laudable ambition indeed for one so gifted. With liberal education he has received, and with his natural talents for art, if he undergoes a term of training in Europe, I have no doubt he would make a name for himself as an artist". This letter handwritten by Varma dated 24 February 1904 is preserved in the Poduval Collections.

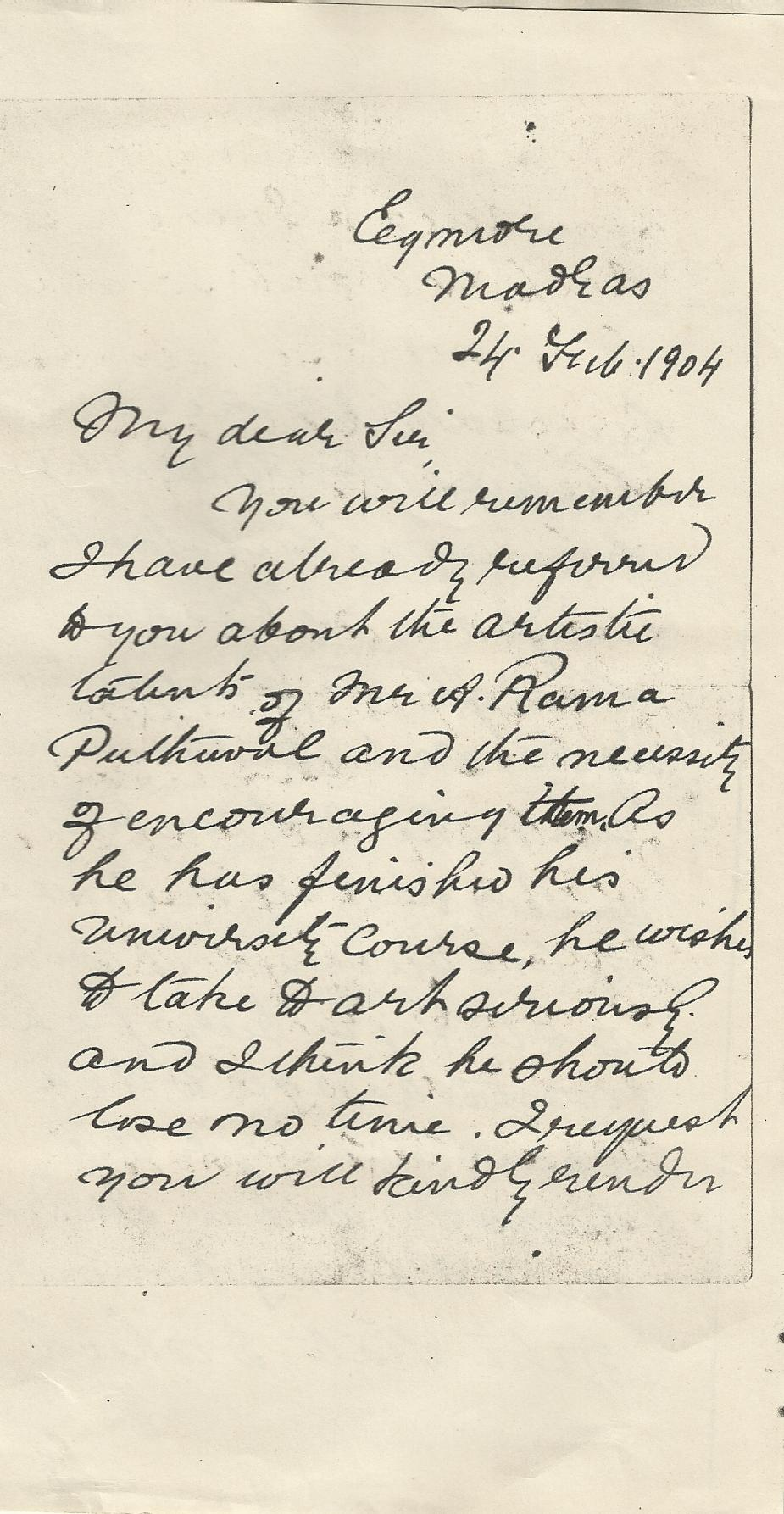
Ravivarma's letter to someone recommending Poduval

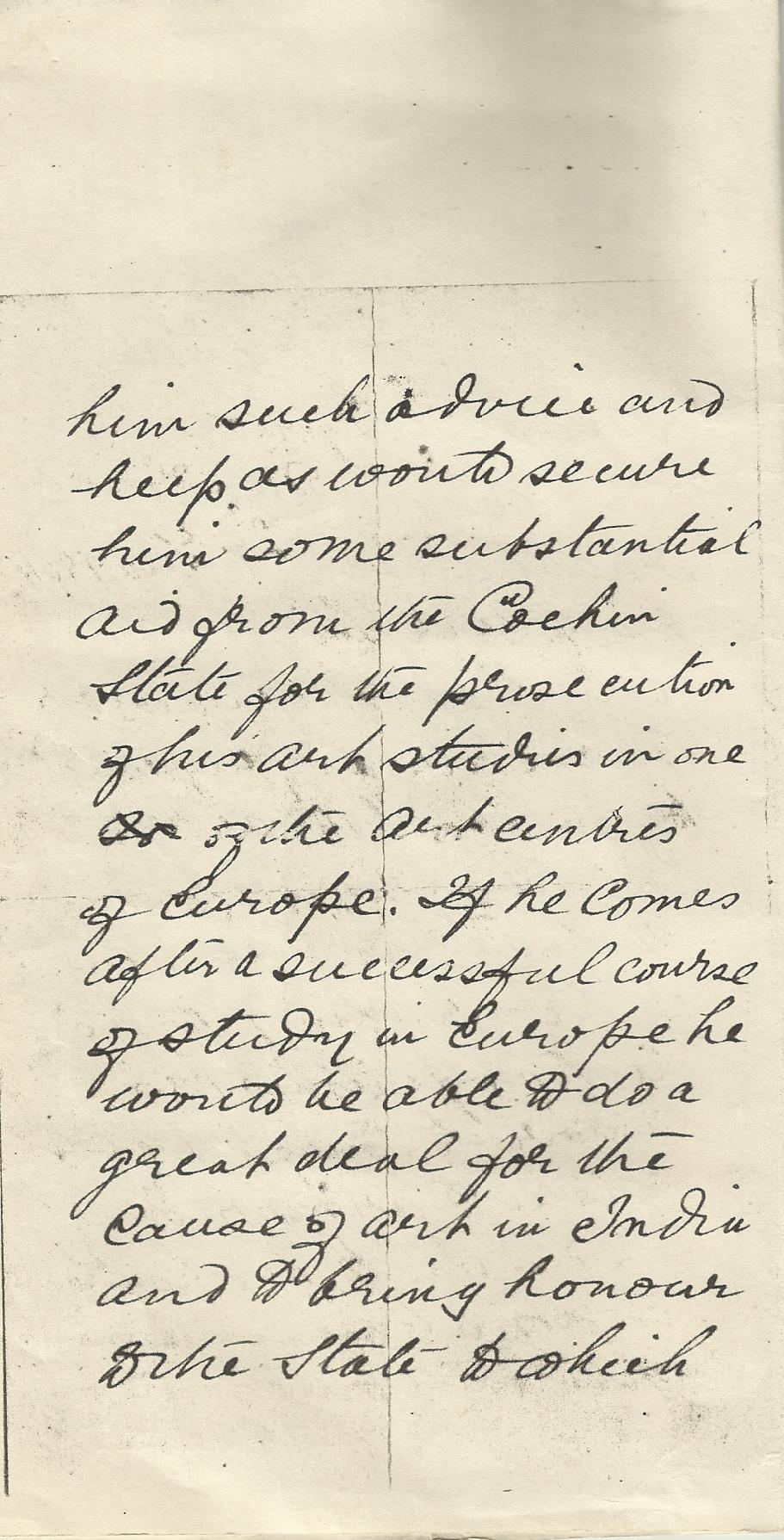
Ravivarma's letter – (Contd.)

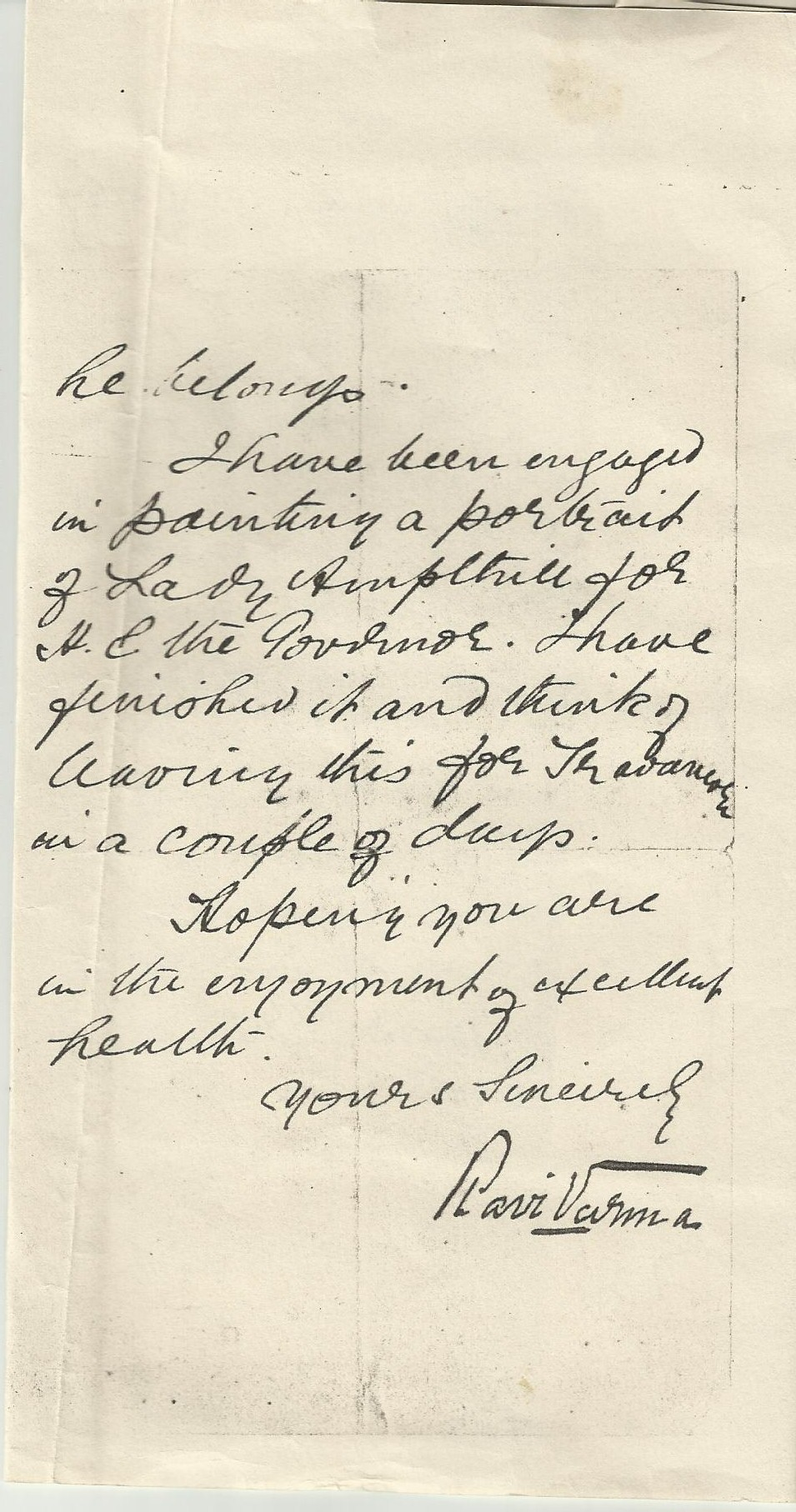
Ravivarma's letter – (Contd.)

But because his family's preference, Poduval was forced to take up Medicine as his profession. While in England, he got a chance to take a course in art, attending evening classes. But his instructors suggested that he should not spoil his own individual style of art by formal training. His travels abroad gave him a chance to realise his long cherished ambition of visiting the famous galleries of art in Europe. Wherever he went, Poduval always had his sketch-book or easel with him. He wielded his scalpel and the paint brush with equal dexterity. The experience he gathered during his journey around the world as a part of his medical profession when he was in military service during World War I reflected in his works with the absolute authenticity of realism a surgeon could impart in painting along with his rational imagination and values of aesthetics. Pencil, charcoal, oil, tempera and water were the mediums he was comfortable with, but his favourite medium was water colour in which his talents were remarkable. As he was a busy surgeon, the time he could devote for art was very little and this limitation forced may pictures to remain unfinished. Still he has left behind a good collection of paintings and sketches. The first solo exhibition of his paintings was held in 1955 at the museum centenary hall, Madras. It was inaugurated by V K Krishna Menon who remarked that Poduval's paintings directly communicate with the ordinary individual. In 1966, the Kerala Lalithakala Academy honoured Dr Poduval by celebrating his birth anniversary and unveiling his portrait. In 1996, another exhibition of his paintings was held Academy Gallery in Trichur.

Poduval was a highly industrious person and in spite of his busy life as a top ranking medical surgeon, he found time not only to practise art, but also to write articles and gave lectures, both in English and in Malayalam, relating to Medicine, art and various other topical subjects.

This article written by Dr A R Poduval was so much appreciated by Mahatma Gandhi that he got it reprinted in Young India

One of his articles, "The Creative Delight" was so much appreciated by Mahatma Gandhi that he got it reprinted in Young India. Gandhi wrote "Under the heading 'The Creative Delight' there appears in St. Berchmans' College Magazine a very readable and thought provoking article by Capt. A R Poduval of Cochin. Though for the pages of 'Young India' it may be considered somewhat long, I have not had the courage to mutilate it. I present the reader with the whole of Capt. Poduval's article in the hope that it will bring converts to the great cause of Daridranarayan." The article, with Gandhi's introduction was again published in The Hindu of August 1929.

== Poduval's family ==
He belonged to the well-known family of Ambadi in Thrissur. His father was T Sesha Iyer. His mother died while he was very young and he was looked after by a relative, who he called 'Ammini Amma'. He was married to Thekke Kuruppath Parukutty Amma who was a great help and support to him in his medical and artistic career. They had three daughters:

- Leela Mannadi Nair, wife of Ankarath Achuthanunni Mannadi Nair. She was an active social worker and was the MLA of Trichur in Travancore-Cochin Assembly (1954–56).
- Kamala Dasgupta, wife of the eminent Indian sculptor, Pradosh Dasgupta. She is considered as the first woman sculptor of modern India and had won a lifetime achievement award from West Bengal Government in 2001. Her son, Prabuddha Dasgupta was a noted fashion and fine-art photographer from India.
- Vimala Nayar, retired professor of Calicut Medical College, She was married to Manakampat Kesavan Unni Nayar, who was killed in a mine explosion in 1950, while serving as one of India's alternate delegates to the UN Commission in Korea.

== Selected paintings ==
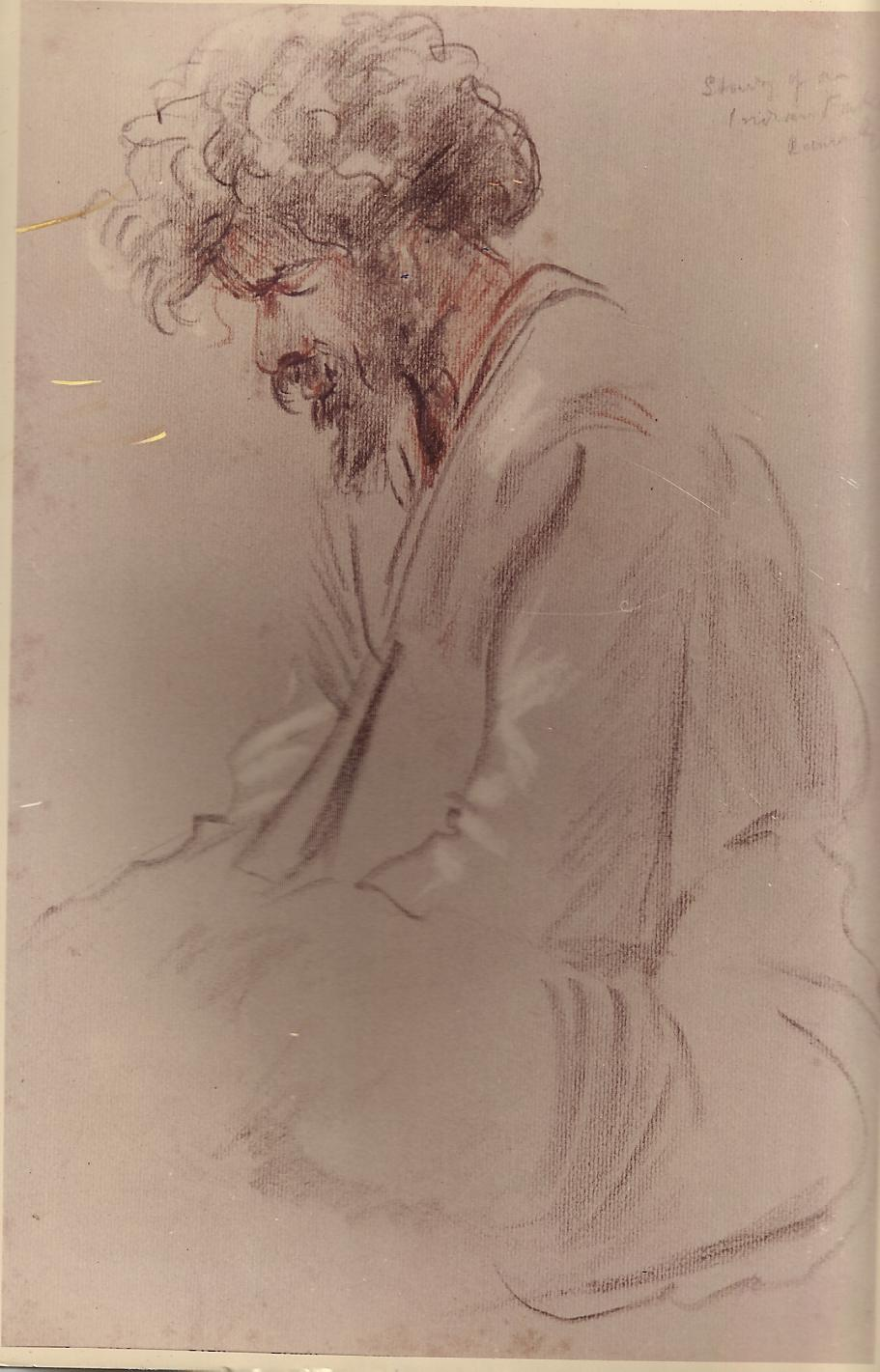
Study of Indian Fakir (1935)

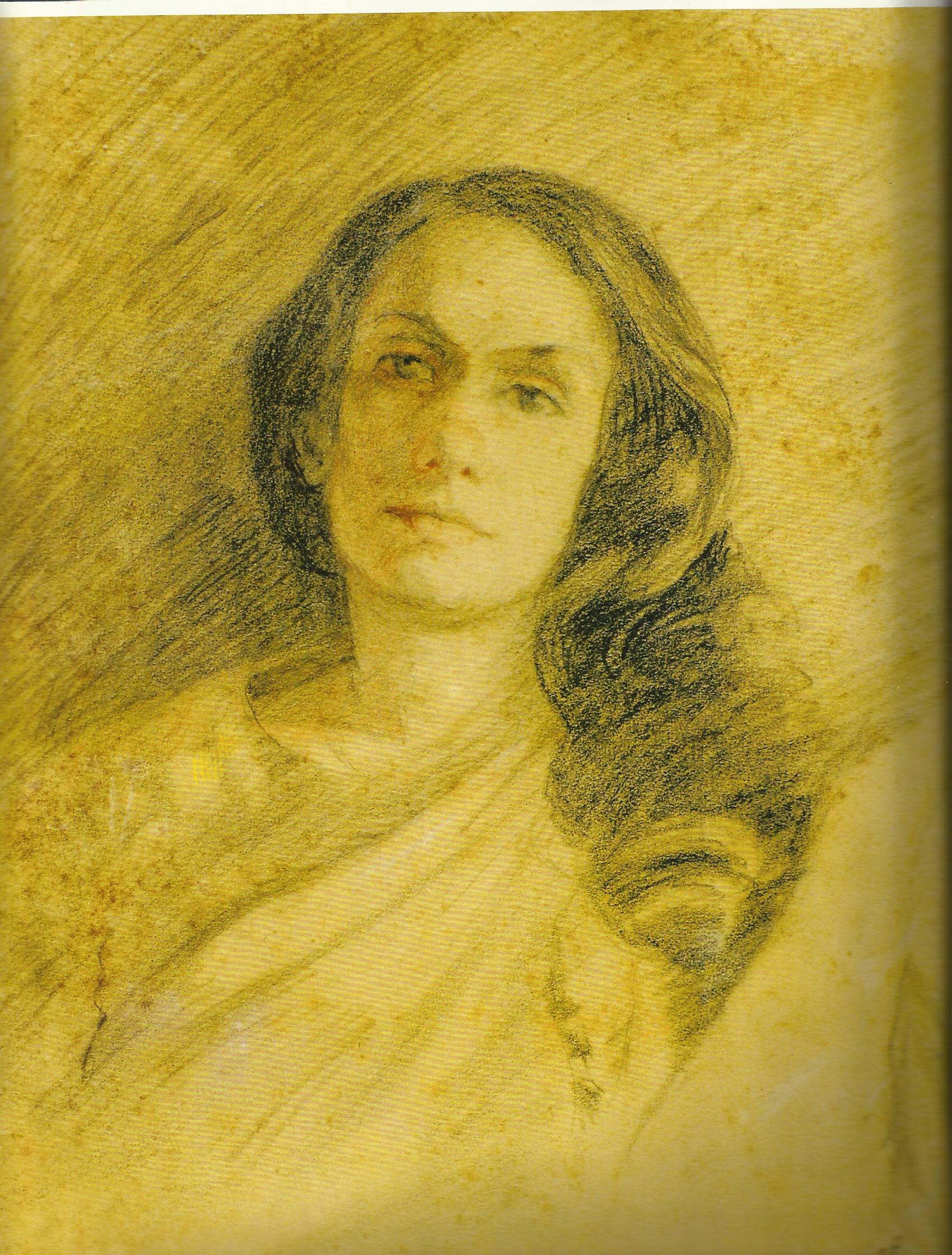
Artist's wife/Charcoal and Crayons (1935)

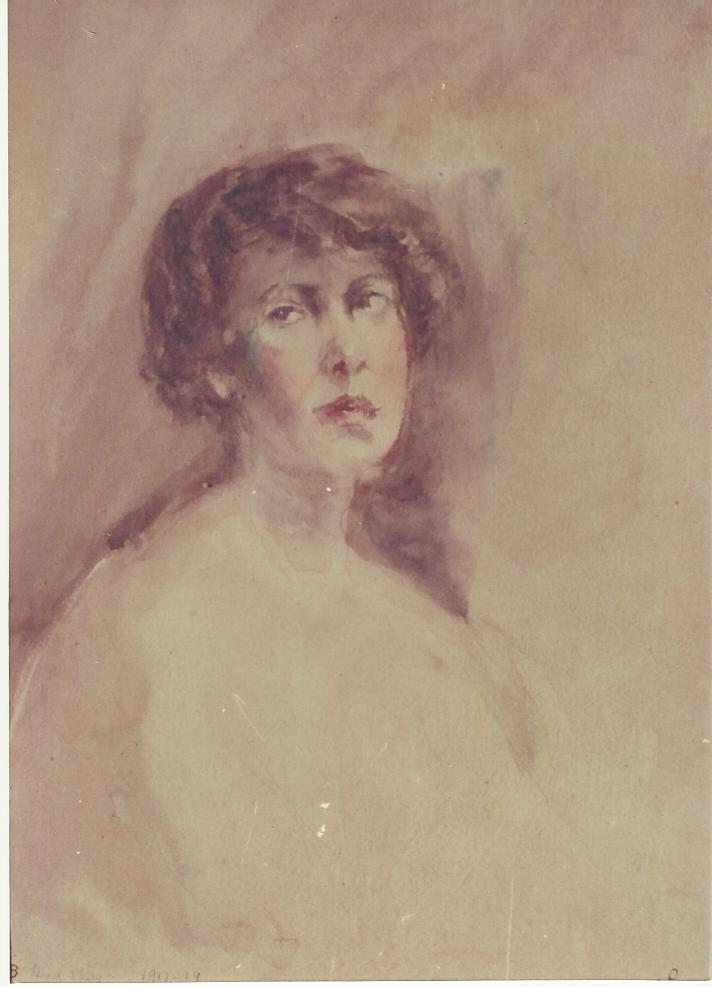
Head of a woman (1918)

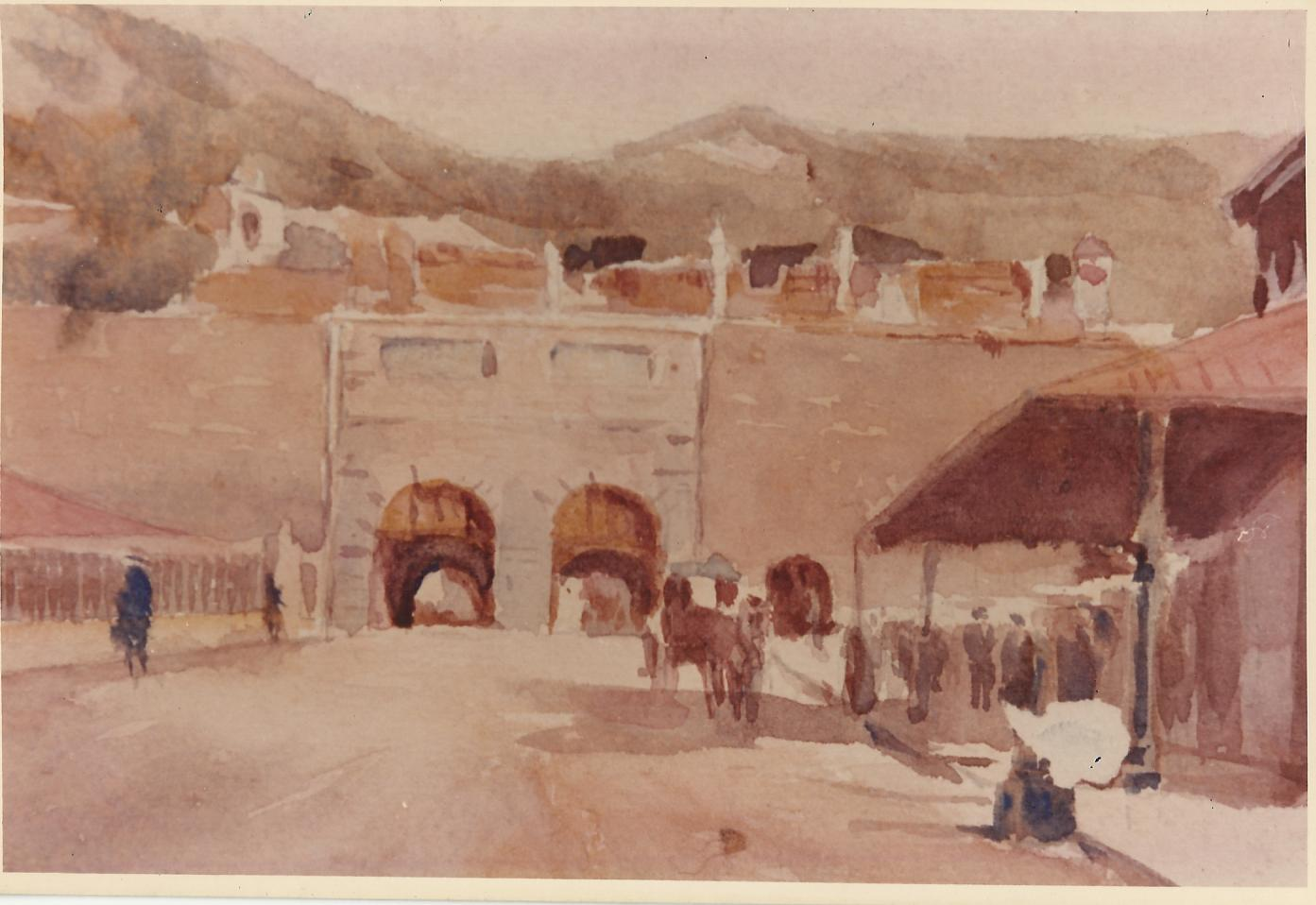
Baghdad (1919)

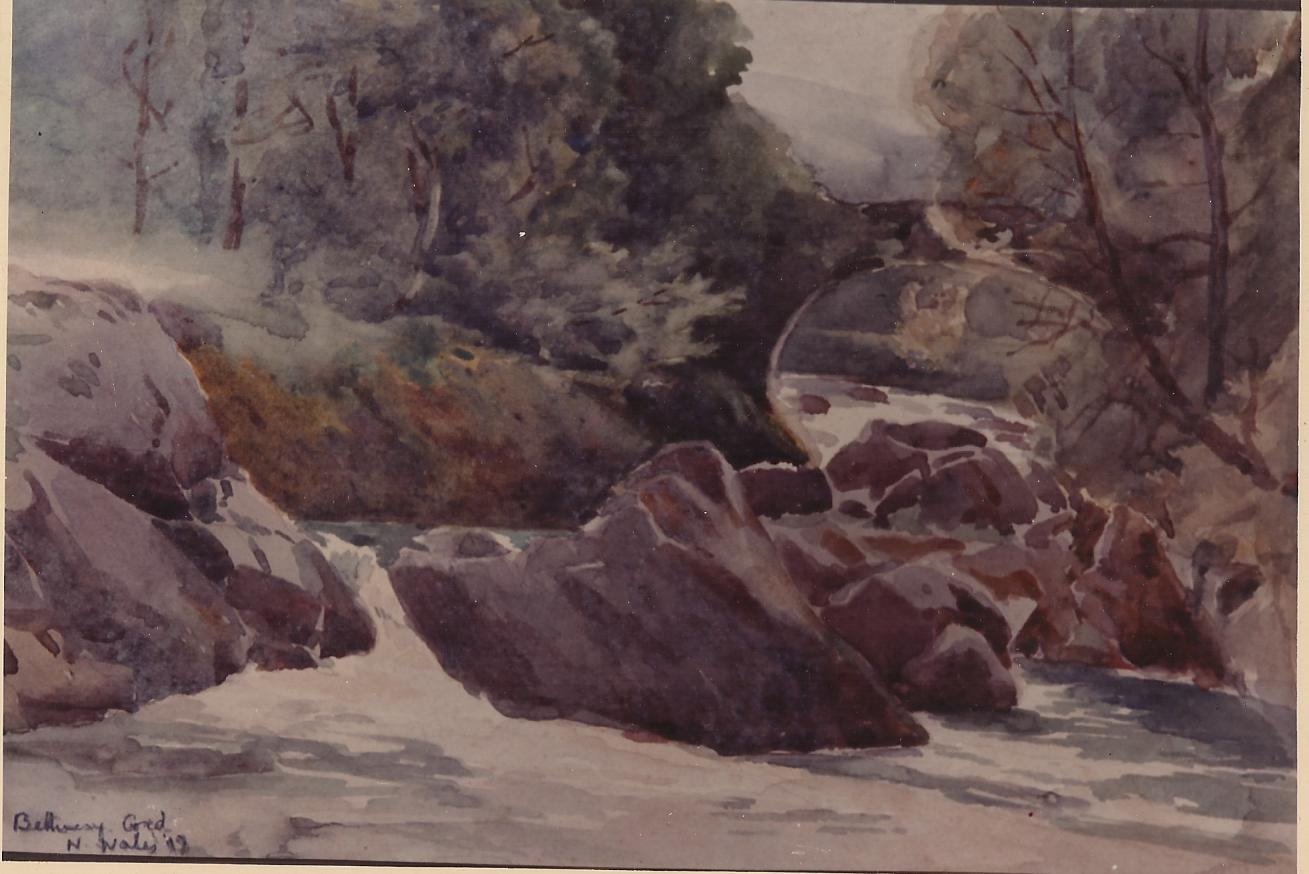
Bethan -N, Wales (1917)

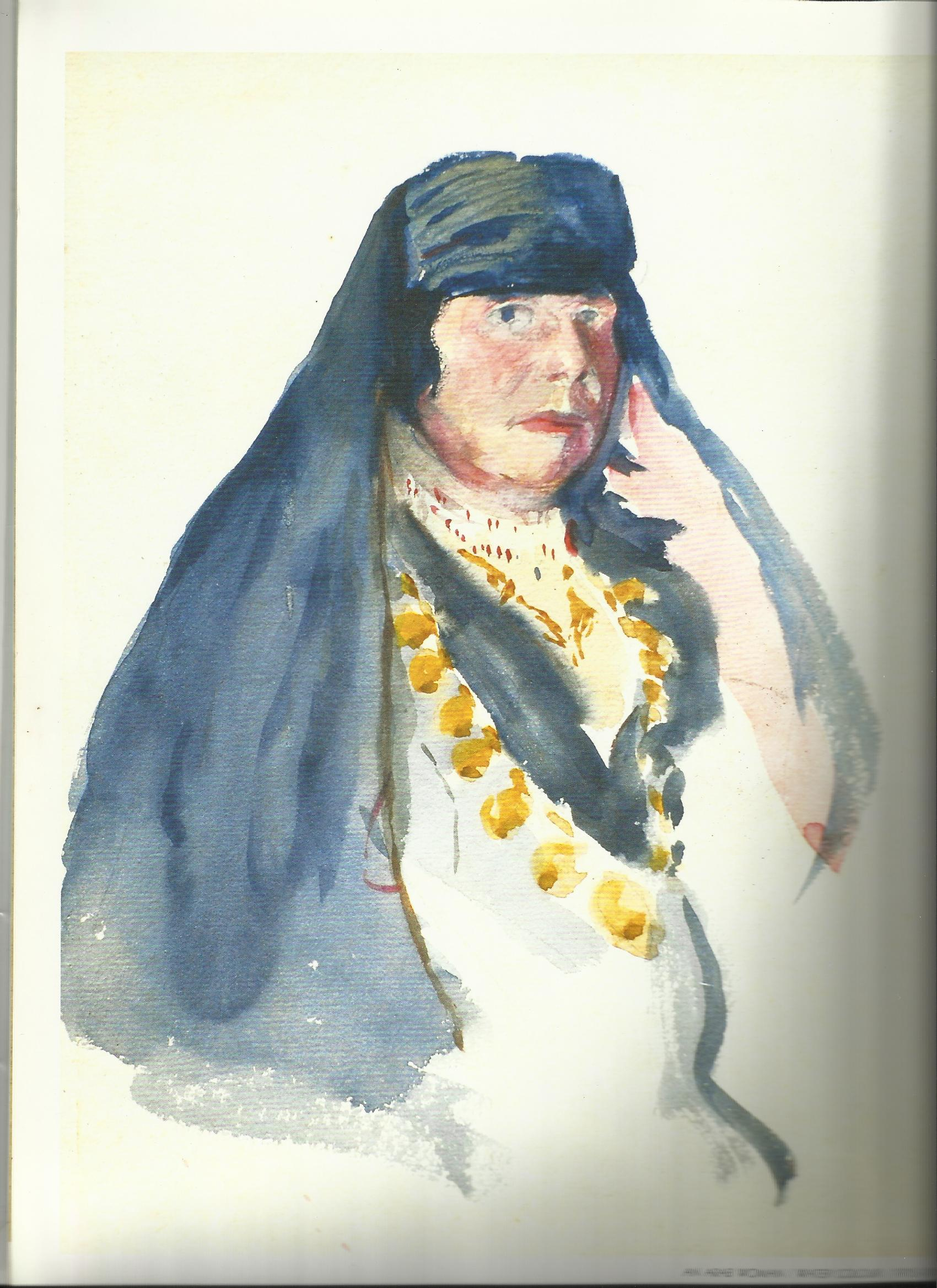
An Arab Woman (1915)

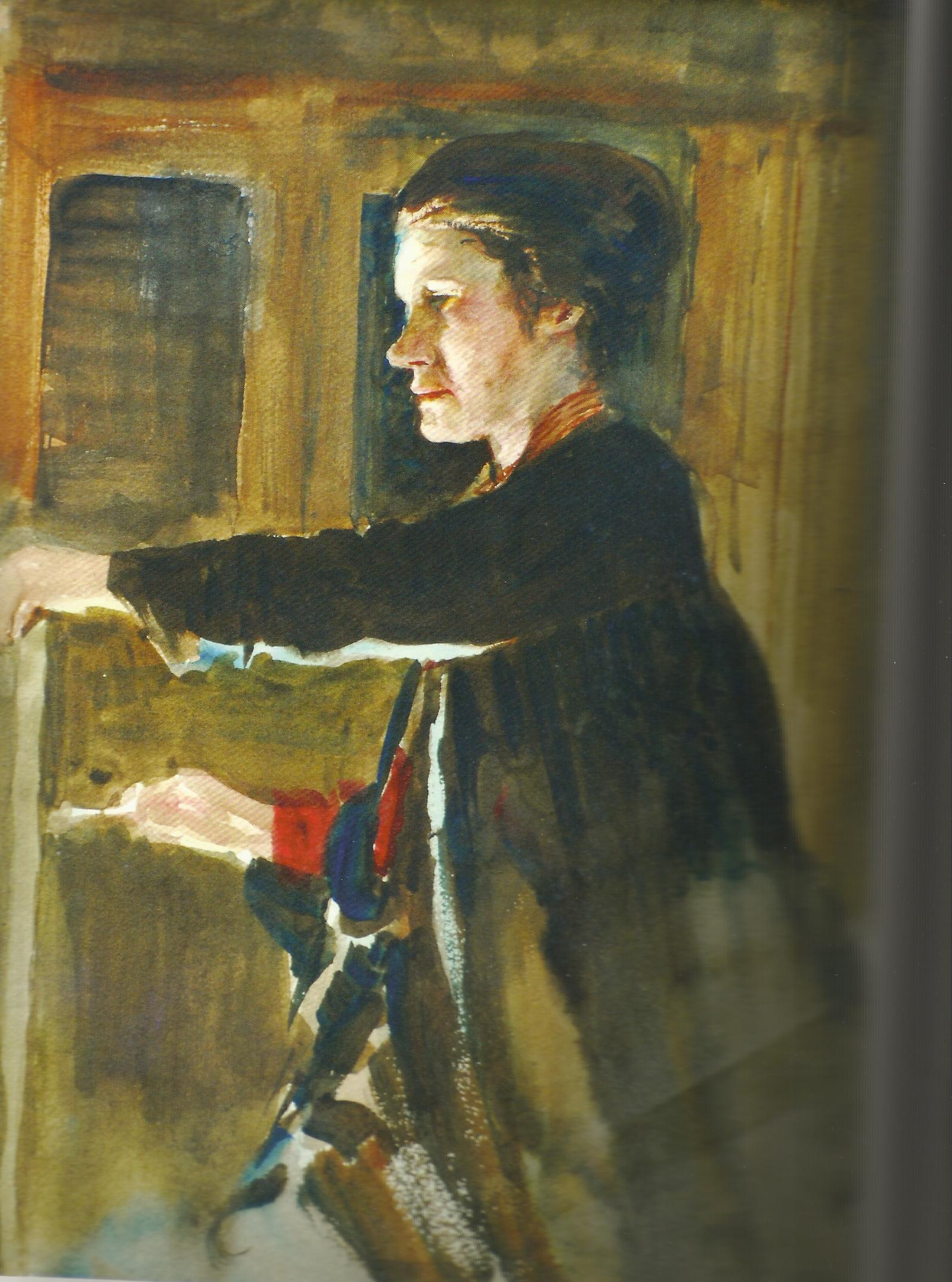
Woman at the door (1919)
