= Ian Morrison (journalist) =

Australian journalist and war correspondent

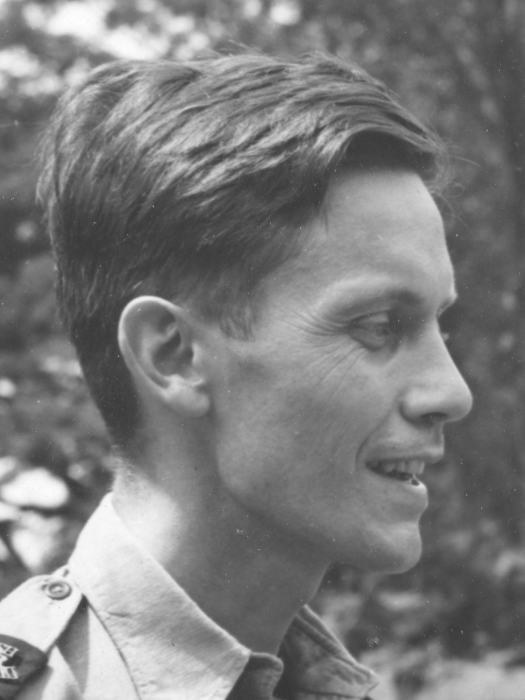
Ian Morrison c1944

Ian Ernest McLeavy Morrison (31 May 1913 – 12 August 1950) was an Australian journalist and war correspondent for The Times. He was one of the first journalists to be killed in the Korean War. The Academy Award-nominated film Love is a Many-Splendored Thing is based on Morrison's love affair with author Han Suyin in Hong Kong.

== Early career ==
He was born on 31 May 1913 in Peking, as the oldest son to Australian adventurer and journalist George Ernest Morrison (1862–1920) and Jennie Wark Robin (1889–1923). His father had been living in Peking on and off since 1897, when he had been stationed there as The Times' first Peking correspondent. In 1919, the family moved to the United Kingdom, where the father died in 1920. Ian Morrison and his two younger brothers, Alastair Gwynne (1915–2009) and Colin (1917–1990), were all educated at Winchester College before continuing to Cambridge University.

From 1935 to 1938, Morrison was appointed English lecturer at Hokkaido Imperial University in Sapporo, Japan. From 1938, he was secretary to the British ambassador in Tokyo, Sir Robert Craigie.

In 1941, Morrison married the Austrian/Czechoslovak Maria Therese Neubauer in Hong Kong. They had met earlier in Shanghai. They had two children, Nicholas and Petra. In 1946, his brother Colin married Maria's sister, Steffi.

== Second World War ==
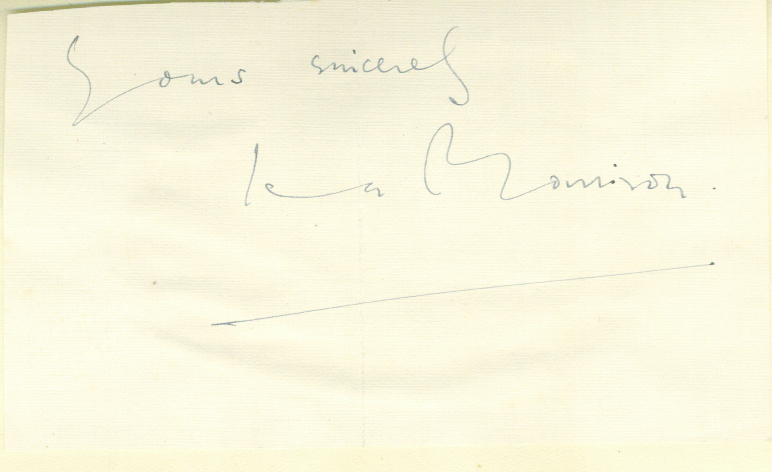
Ian Morrison Signature during 1930s.

During the Second World War, Morrison covered the Pacific Front, being promoted from freelance contributor to full-time staff correspondent of The Times. His first assignment was to cover the Battle of Singapore. During a November 1942 air raid during the Battle of Buna-Gona, he was mildly injured. In December 1943, he fractured his vertebrae and suffered head trauma as a result of a plane crash on New Guinea. He then telegraphed The Times:

Regret involved in airplane accident enroute obtain eyewitness operational full stop hospitalised injuries seriouser than yestertime hope recover soon Dickson Brown newschronicler kindly consented cover next three days thereafter Curthoys sorry disappoint you good story

He did not return to combat journalism for seven months, and by the following December he had been shot once again, so he telegraphed The Times:

Left hospital today. Thumb, in which fragments of Dutch bullet are lodged, will take at least a fortnight to heal up, but hope to resume filing about Thursday. Another bullet grazed side without doing any damage.

Morrison wrote four books related to World War II:

- Malayan Postscript (London: Faber and Faber Limited, 1942)
- This War against Japan (London: Faber and Faber Limited, 1943)
- Our Japanese Foe (New York: G.P. Putnam's Sons, 1943)
- Grandfather Longlegs: The Life and Gallant Death of Major H.P. Seagrim, G.C., D.S.O. (London: Faber and Faber Limited, 1947)

== Between the wars ==
After the war, he was stationed in Singapore as a correspondent for The Times and travelled widely for them. While visiting Hong Kong, he met and had a love affair with local doctor and future author Han Suyin (according to his aunt, he was a ladies man with paramours all over the Far East and in Australia). Their story was told in her semi-autobiographical first novel A Many-Splendoured Thing which was made into a very successful film (with him now American and played by William Holden) in 1955.

== Korean War ==
When the Korean War broke out in 1950, Morrison was despatched there by The Times. He published his first article from the front on 10 July.

He died on 12 August 1950, when a jeep carrying him, Indian Colonel M. K. Unni Nayar, and British journalist Christopher Buckley, struck a landmine that killed all three. He and Buckley were buried together at a private mission cemetery in Daegu with other correspondents acting as pallbearers. An American Guard of Honour fired a salute, and the Last Post was sounded. His name is listed in the Hong Kong Foreign Correspondents' Club as a member killed in the line of duty.
