= M. K. Unni Nayar =

Indian journalist and diplomat

- Born: 22 April 1911; Kerala, India
- Died: 12 August 1950 (aged 39); Daegu, South Korea
- Military career
- Allegiance: India
- Rank: Colonel
- Unit: UN Commission on Korea
- Conflicts: Korean War †

Manakampat Kesavan Unni Nayar (22 April 1911 – 12 August 1950) was an Indian military colonel, journalist, and diplomat who was killed in the Korean War while working on behalf of the United Nations.

== Early life and education ==
He was born 22 April 1911 at Manakampat house near Parli, 7 miles (11 km) from Palakkad in the state of Kerala in southern India. After an uneventful early education, he took his honours in Literature, from the Madras Christian College. His literary talents were first discovered, in the College Magazine. He began his professional career at a humorous weekly publication, The Merry Magazine of Madras. He soon moved to The Mail, a Madras daily, but continued to contribute to the Merry Magazine.

== Career ==
Later, he worked in Washington, Singapore, Burma, Libya and various locations in the Middle East and North Africa. While serving as a U.N. delegate in Korea in 1950, he was killed (with journalists Christopher Buckley and Ian Morrison) by a land mine exploding under their jeep. A memorial dedicated to him is sited at Waegwan, South Korea.

An obituary published by the government of India said:

The Government of India have learnt, with deep regret, of the death of Colonel Unni Nayar, one of India’s alternate Delegates to the U.N. Commission in Korea. Colonel Nayar was killed by a mine explosion while out for observation. Colonel Nayar’s early promise in journalism reached destination during the Second World War in which he saw duty on many fronts. His work in reporting these campaigns was marked by vivid objectivity and great personal gallantry. He also served as an Observer during the operation in Kashmir. In 1948, he was posted to Washington as Public Relations Officer of the Indian Embassy, in which capacity he did valuable work. On the outbreak of hostilities in Korea, he volunteered for service there and the Government of India selected him to serve as an alternate Delegate on the U.N. Korean Commission. His dispatches from there proved invaluable to Government in forming an appreciation of the Korean situation. His early and tragic death in no less a loss to the Government of India than to his family, to whom Government extend their profound sympathy.
