= Christopher Buckley (journalist) =

British journalist and historian (1905-1950)

- Born: 22 May 1905; United Kingdom
- Died: 12 August 1950 (aged 45); Korea
- Occupations: Journalist, historian

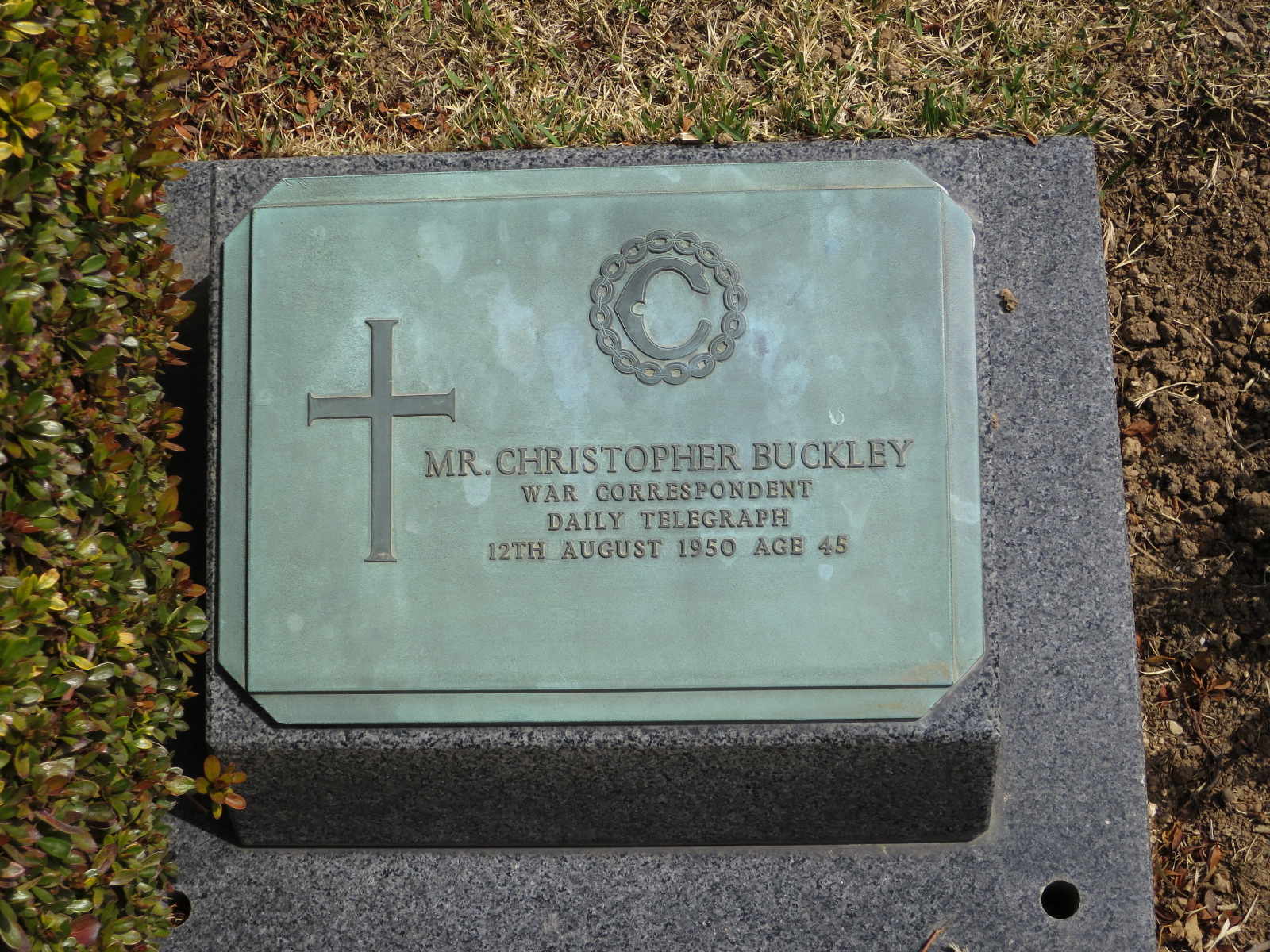
Buckley's grave at the UN Memorial Cemetery

Christopher Buckley (22 May 1905 – 12 August 1950) was a British journalist and historian working for The Daily Telegraph newspaper.

Buckley studied military history at Oxford before he started as a war correspondent in 1940. His reporting from battles and front lines in World War II earned him international prestige. He was the author of Road to Rome, An Account of Military Operations in Italy, 1943–44 (1945) and wrote official accounts of military operations (e.g., the History of the Second World War) for His Majesty's Stationery Office (HMSO). He was the author of two novels, Rain Before Seven (1947) and Royal Chase (1949). The first of these has been described as "something of a forgotten late golden age classic" in the crime fiction field.

In 1950, while reporting from the Korean War, he was killed (with journalist Ian Morrison and Colonel M. K. Unni Nayar) by a landmine exploding under their jeep. He is buried at the United Nations Memorial Cemetery in Busan, South Korea.

Richard Knott's 2015 book The Trio (ISBN 978-0-7509-5593-5) is an account of Buckley's work as a war correspondent and his friendships with Alexander Clifford and Alan Moorehead.
