= Battle honours of the British and Imperial Armies =

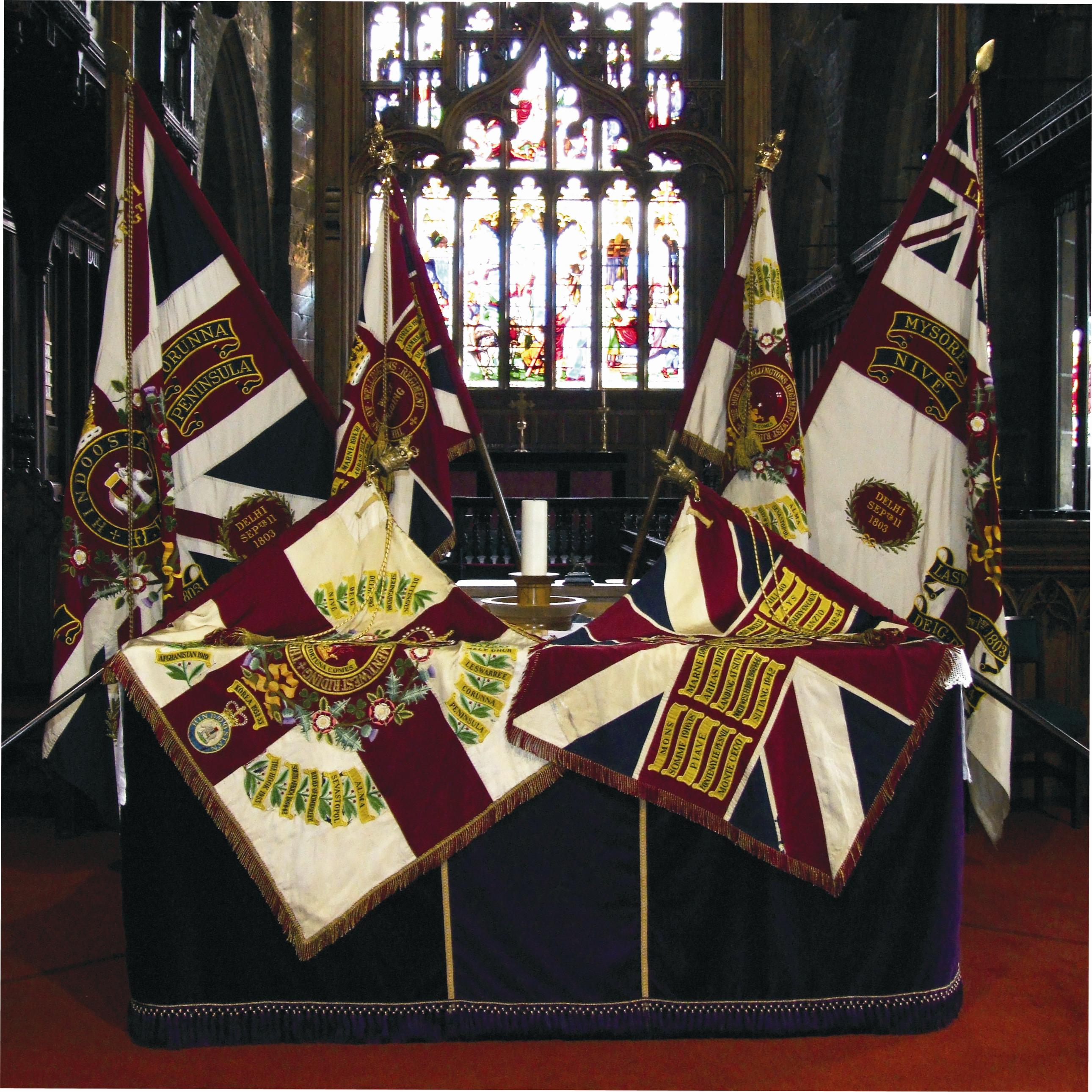
Colours of the 1st Battalion, Duke of Wellington's Regiment (West Riding), showing emblazoned Battle Honours

The following battle honours were awarded to units of the British Army and the armies of British India and the Dominions of the British Empire. From their institution until the end of the Second World War, awards were made by, or in consultation with, the British government, but, since 1945, the individual countries of the former British Empire have awarded battle honours to their forces independently.

== Origins ==
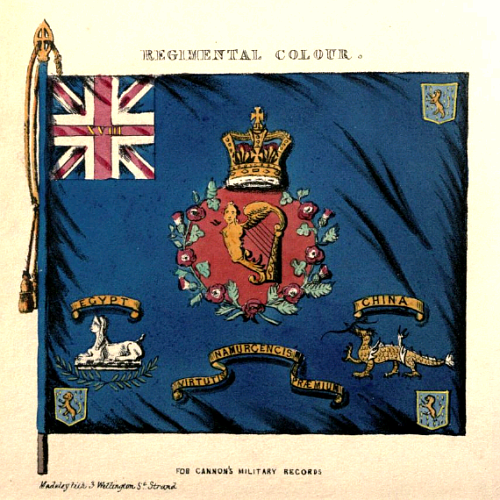
Regimental Colour of the 18th Regiment of Foot showing the earliest battle honour (for Namur) and the badges later awarded for Egypt and China.

The first battle honour was the motto Virtutis Namurcensis Præmium (Reward for valour at Namur), ordered by King William III to be emblazoned on the colour of the 18th Regiment of Foot, later the Royal Irish Regiment, for their part in the Siege of Namur in 1695. Many years later, in 1910, the honour Namur 1695 was awarded to 14 regiments, including the Royal Irish. In 1768, the 15th Light Dragoons, later 15th The King's Hussars, were uniquely awarded the honour Emsdorf to be worn on their helmets in commemoration of their success at the Battle of Emsdorf in 1760.

The first battle honour displayed on the colours in the modern manner was awarded in 1784 when four infantry regiments that took part in the defence of Gibraltar of 1779–83 were ordered to display the word Gibraltar on a scroll on their Second (now Regimental) Colour. Later, a badge of the Castle and Key was added, with a scroll carrying the motto Montis Insignia Calpe below it, and the word Gibraltar was changed to Gibraltar 1779–83. Although this award was made promptly after the event, this is not always the case: the oldest battle honours, Tangier 1662–1680 and Tangier 1680, were awarded in 1909, over 220 years after the temporary but tumultuous occupation of that port.

== Development and formalization ==
The procedure for awarding battle honours was originally extremely arbitrary. For example, the victories of the Duke of Wellington in the Napoleonic Wars were copiously honoured, but those of the Duke of Marlborough in the War of Spanish Succession were entirely ignored. By the mid-19th Century, honours were being awarded for contemporary actions that were little more than skirmishes compared with the great European battles of the 18th Century. Much, too, depended on the persistence (or lack thereof) of successive individual colonels in badgering Horse Guards for honours for their regiments: to give but one example, the honour for Corunna was first awarded (to three battalions) in 1811; between then and 1842, it was awarded to a further 27 regiments and battalions. A committee was therefore set up under Major-General Sir Archibald Alison in 1881 to determine the honours that should be awarded to the various regiments for past battles. Although the Alison Committee remedied the worst of the injustices when it reported in 1882 (by, inter alia, awarding the honours Blenheim, Ramillies, Oudenarde and Malplaquet), another committee had to be set up in 1909 under the chairmanship of Lieutenant General Sir Spencer Ewart to continue the work.

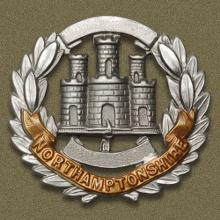
Badge of the 4th Battalion, the Northamptonshire Regiment, of the period 1908 to 1917. Since this is the badge of a Territorial battalion, the scrolls which, on the badge of the regular battalions, carried the battle honours Gibraltar and Talavera are here blank.

Until 1832, battle honours were awarded to a specific unit and, if it was disbanded, the honour was lost. After this date, honours were awarded to the parent regiment of the battalion whose actions led to the award. During the Second Boer War, however, some honours were awarded to the Militia battalions of infantry regiments in their own right. Also, the honours Mediterranean 1901–02 and St Helena were awarded to the Militia battalions of several regiments for garrison and prisoner-of-war camp duty. When the Militia was disbanded, these honours (and the earlier Mediterranean, earned for similar service during the Crimean War) were allowed to lapse. In 1917, in recognition of their sacrifice in the Great War, the battalions of the Territorial Force were permitted to carry the honours of their parent regular battalions on their badges, a practice that had previously been forbidden.

Also in 1832, the motto Ubique (Everywhere) was awarded by King William IV to the Royal Artillery and the Royal Engineers in recognition of their universal service. It was stipulated that this was considered to be a battle honour, substituting for all other prior and future distinctions. As such, it did not initially appear on the badges or appointments of the Territorial, Militia or Volunteer regiments of these Corps. Despite it being the sole battle honour of the Royal Artillery, a number of Artillery officers who served in the First China War were awarded the personal honour China. This honour was displayed on their appointments and was not extended to other ranks or to the regiment as a whole. It was a unique award which was allowed to lapse in time, and the procedure was never repeated.

King William IV was also responsible for a most peculiar guidon-shaped standard presented to the Royal Horse Guards on 13 August 1832, which, in addition to carrying the battle honours Peninsula and Waterloo, bore the words Dettingen, Minden, Warbourg and Cateau. None of these last four were battle honours to which the Royal Horse Guards were entitled at the time the standard was presented. The regiment was awarded Dettingen (with 1st and 2nd Life Guards) in 1882 and Warburg (so spelled) in 1909. Cateau was never awarded as such, but Beaumont was awarded for the same battle, again in 1909. No cavalry regiment was ever honoured for Minden because of the cavalry's conspicuous lack of activity in that battle.

In 1834, the guidons of the light cavalry (Light Dragoons, Lancers and Hussars) were withdrawn in order to improve the mobility of these regiments. Until they were restored (in a purely ceremonial role) by King George VI in 1952, these regiments displayed their honours on their officers' saddle cloths, their drums, drum banners and other appointments.

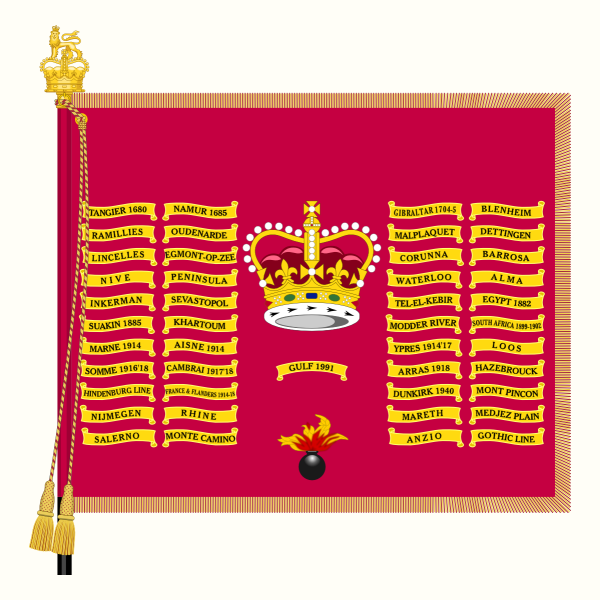
Queen's Colour of the 1st Battalion, the Grenadier Guards. In contrast with those of the line infantry regiments, the Queen's Colours of Foot Guards regiments are crimson, and it is their Regimental Colours that are based on the Union Flag. Foot Guards regiments also emblazon the same honours (from all conflicts, including both World Wars) on both colours.

In 1844, the display of honours and badges on the infantry's colours was standardized. Embellishments that had previously been borne on either, or both, of a battalion's colours were, after this, only permitted to appear on the Second Colour, which was renamed the Regimental Colour. The First Colour was renamed the Royal Colour and was to be free of decoration other than for the Royal Crown and the regimental number. The Foot Guards, however, continued to display their awards on all their colours (as they do, with some variation between the regiments, to this day). In addition, the 1857 Dress Regulations ordered that the blades of the Foot Guards officers' swords be embossed with the regiment's device and battle honours.

== The Boer War ==
The Second Boer War came as an unpleasant surprise to a British military establishment that had stagnated for decades under the command of the hidebound and reactionary Duke of Cambridge. As Lord Kitchener observed, 'The Boers are not like the Sudanese who stood up to a fair fight. They are always running away on their little ponies', and the disasters of Black Week demonstrated that the Regular army was numerically, technologically and tactically ill-prepared to face a militarily competent and well-equipped adversary. Among the responses of the British government to these setbacks were the formation of the Imperial Yeomanry and the embodiment of the Militia and Volunteer battalions of the infantry regiments for overseas service. Many more corps, therefore, became eligible for campaign honours than had been the case in any previous war: including the Regular Army, Yeomanry, Militia and Volunteers, a total of 196 British regiments were awarded South Africa with appropriate year dates between 1899 and 1902. The award was also made to a further 22 Canadian, 37 Australian, 23 New Zealand and 12 South African regiments. As pointed out above, the awards made to the Militia battalions lapsed when the Militia was disbanded.

It was at this time that the rule was instituted that, for a cavalry regiment or infantry battalion to be eligible for an award, the Headquarters and fifty per cent or more of its strength must have been present. Exception was made for the Yeomanry regiments, which had contributed company-sized contingents to the Imperial Yeomanry, but not their individual regimental headquarters. These regiments were considered to be eligible if parties of 20 or more had been present. These principles (presence of a unit's headquarters and fifty per cent or more of its strength) were continued by General Ewart's and subsequent Battle Honours committees, but, again, numerous exceptions were made.

== The World Wars ==
The sheer scale of the Great War led to a previously unheard of number of honours being awarded and it was simply impractical to emblazon every one of them on the Regimental Colour. It was at first ordered, in September 1922, that regiments should select up to 10 honours to be emblazoned on their Regimental Colours along with previous awards, up to a total of 24. This led to a storm of protest, since many regiments would have had to remove previous honours. The order was, therefore, amended the following December to allow each infantry regiment to select up to 10 honours to be emblazoned on its King's Colour, honours from other conflicts continuing to be displayed on the Regimental Colour. After the Second World War, a further 10 honours from that conflict were added to the King's Colour. Owing to amalgamations, more than the total of 20 First and Second World War awards may be found on the Queen's Colour of modern regiments. Cavalry regiments emblazoned honours from the World Wars on the reverse side of their standards and guidons.

Battle honours of the Great War were almost invariably only awarded for engagements specifically named by the Battles Nomenclature Committee. A particularly poignant exception to this rule is that of the Royal Newfoundland Regiment which applied for the honour Beaumont Hamel in memory of the first day of the Battle of the Somme, when the regiment was virtually wiped out. The award was declined by the Battle Honours Committee because there was no official battle of that name. After considerable correspondence between the Colonial Office and the government of Newfoundland, a compromise was reached whereby the regiment would be awarded the honour Albert (Beaumont Hamel) 1916, but only with the personal approval of the King. Needless to say, the King approved the award without hesitation.

The procedures after the Second World War were similar to those following the First. The re-formed Battles Nomenclature Committee made every effort to avoid using names that had been used by the Great War committee but, if this was not practicable, the awards were differenced by year date (e.g. Baghdad, Baghdad 1941). If two separate engagements took place at the same location in the same year, they were differenced by Roman numerals (e.g. Cassino I, Cassino II). In several instances, the Battles Nomenclature Committee felt it was desirable to indicate the aim or nature of the operation, particularly when two separate operations took place at the same location (e.g. Capture of Tobruk, Defence of Tobruk).

== Territorial Army honorary distinctions of the Second World War ==
During the Second World War, a number of Territorial Army infantry battalions and Yeomanry regiments were temporarily re-roled to other arms (particularly artillery, signals and reconnaissance) for the duration of the conflict and resumed their normal function at its end. It was decided that such units were not eligible for battle honours per se, but could apply for Honorary Distinctions commemorating service in actions and theatres that would, had they taken part in their normal roles, have entitled them to battle honours. (Units whose conversion to the new arm was permanent were awarded battle honours appropriate to their new arm.) In the case of infantry battalions, these distinctions were awarded solely to the battalion concerned and were not borne by the other battalions of the regiment, and, unlike actual battle honours from the World Wars, were carried on the Regimental Colour. It appears that this decision was poorly received by the units concerned, particularly the Yeomanry, and relatively few applications were made.

== Badges ==
The majority of battle honours are displayed simply as the name of the award inscribed on a decorative scroll. A number of honours, particularly those which were considered to be of particular significance, were awarded with a badge that in some way represented the engagement or theatre. Early examples were the castle and key for Gibraltar, mentioned above, and the sphinx for Egypt. Tiger and elephant badges were frequently awarded for engagements on the Indian sub-continent. Different badges might be awarded to different units for the same battle or campaign: the award Hindoostan, for example, was awarded without a badge to some regiments, with a tiger to others, and with an elephant to yet others.

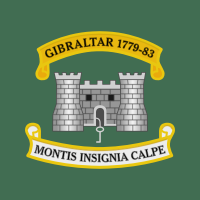
Badge of the castle and key awarded for the Great Siege of Gibraltar.

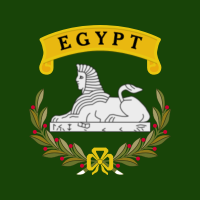
Badge of the sphinx awarded for the Egyptian Campaign of 1801.

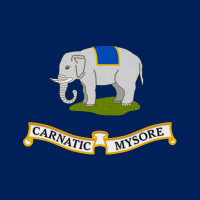
Badge of an elephant for the Second and Third Mysore Wars.

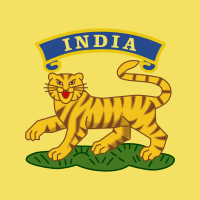
A tiger badge awarded for service in India.

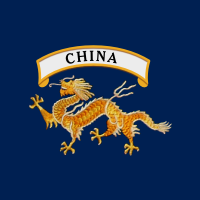
A China Dragon awarded for the First China War.

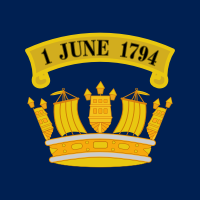
Naval crowns could be awarded to infantry battalions that took part in naval battles.

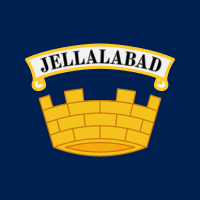
A mural crown, uniquely awarded to the 13th (1st Somersetshire) Regiment (Light Infantry), later the Somerset Light Infantry, for the defence of Jellalabad.

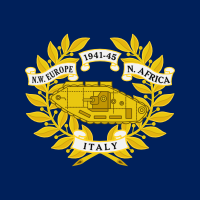
An example of an Honorary Distinction awarded to a Territorial Army battalion re-rôled during the Second World War as an armoured regiment.

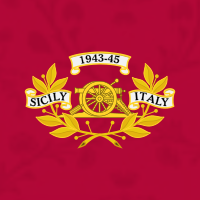
Another Honorary Distinction from the Second World War, here awarded to the Shropshire Yeomanry for service as a Royal Artillery regiment.

== 1662–1906 ==
Tangier 1662 to 1680 is the British Army's oldest Battle Honour, awarded for the garrison defence of Tangier in North Africa (Morocco). Tangier became a possession of England from the dowery from the marriage of Catherine of Braganza to King Charles II. The Battle Honour is carried today by the Princess of Wales's Royal Regiment (Queen's and Royal Hampshires) and the Blues and Royals (Household Caralry).

Regimental Colour of the 1st Battalion, 24th (2nd Warwickshire) Regiment of Foot (later the South Wales Borderers), presented in 1860 and here shown with the honours awarded up to the time of the Zulu War. This colour was left at the battalion's depot at Helpmakaar during the invasion of Zululand and the Battle of Isandlwana, and thus escaped the fate of the regiment's other colours. It was eventually laid up (with the battalion's Queen's Colour, recovered from the Buffalo River after the battle) in Brecon Cathedral in 1934.

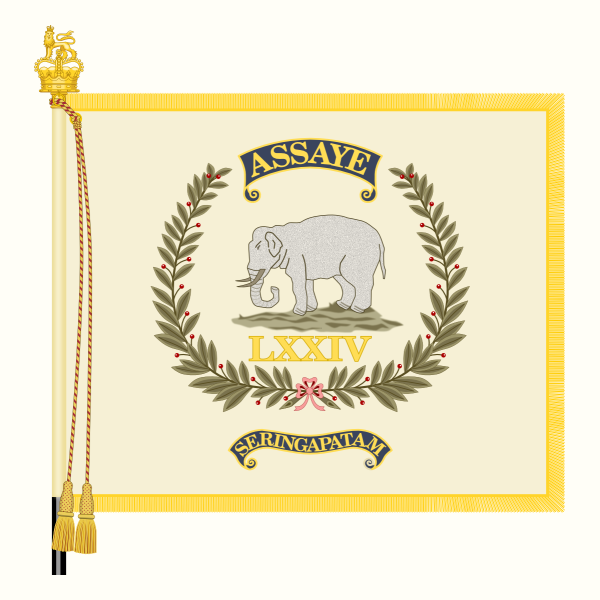
An unusual award of honorary colours was made by the Governor-General of India to the British regiments that participated in the Battle of Assaye in 1803 (19th Light Dragoons, 74th (Highland) Regiment of Foot and 78th (Highlanders) Regiment of Foot). The colour illustrated (on which is also emblazoned the award for Seringapatam) is one previously carried by the Royal Highland Fusiliers, successor to the 74th Foot.

- 1800
- Abu Klea, Abyssinia, Aden, Affghanistan 1839, Afghanistan 1878–80, Ahmed Khel, Albuhera, Ali Masjid, Aliwal, Ally Ghur, Alma, Almaraz, Amboor, Amboyna, Arabia, Arcot, Arracan, Arroyo dos Molinos, Ashantee, Ashanti 1900, Assam, Assaye, Atbara, Ava
- Badajoz, Badara, Balaclava, Banda, Barrosa, Basutoland 1880–81, Batoche, Beaumont, Bechuanaland 1896–97, Behar, Belleisle, Beni Boo Alli, Bhurtpore, Bladensburg, Blenheim, Bourbon, British East Africa 1896–99, British East Africa 1901, Burma 1885–87, Burmah, Busaco, Bushire, Buxar
- Cabul 1842, Candahar 1842, Canton, Cape of Good Hope, Cape of Good Hope 1806, Carnatic, Central India, Charasiah, Chillianwallah, China, China 1858–59, China 1860–62, China 1900, Chitral, Ciudad Rodrigo, Cochin, Condore, Copenhagen, Corunna, Corygaum, Cutchee
- Defence of Arrah, Defence of Chitral, Defence of Kimberley, Defence of Ladysmith, Deig, Delhi 1803, Delhi 1857, Detroit, Dettingen, Dominica, Douro
- Eccles Hill, Egmont-op-Zee, Egypt, Egypt 1882, Egypt 1884, Emsdorf
- Ferozeshah, Fish Creek, Fishguard, Fuentes d'Onor
- Gaika Gaeleka 1877, Ghuznee 1839, Ghuznee 1842, Gibraltar 1704–5, Gibraltar 1779–83, Glorious 1st of June, Goojerat, Griqualand West, Guadeloupe 1759, Guadeloupe 1810, Guzerat
- Hafir, Havannah, Hindoostan, Hyderabad, Hyderabad 1843
- India, Inkerman
- Java, Jellalabad, Jersey 1781
- Kabul 1879, Kahun, Kandahar 1880, Kemmendine, Khartoum, Khelat, Khelat-i-Ghilzai, Kirbekan, Kirkee, Koosh-Ab, Korah
- Leswaree, Lincelles, Louisburg, Lucknow
- Maharajpore, Maheidpore, Maida, Malakand, Malplaquet, Mandora, Mangalore, Marabout, Martinique 1762, Martinique 1794, Martinique 1809, Masulipatam, Mediterranean, Mediterranean 1900–01, Mediterranean 1901, Mediterranean 1901–02, Meeanee, Miami, Minden, Modder River, Monte Video, Moodkee, Mooltan, Moro, Mysore
- Nagpore, Namur 1695, Natal 1906, New Zealand, Niagara, Nieuport, Nile 1884–85, Nive, Nivelle, North America 1763–64, North West Canada 1885, Nowah, Nundy Droog
- Orthes, Oudenarde
- Paardeberg, Pegu, Peiwar Kotal, Pekin, Pekin 1900, Peninsula, Perak, Persia, Persian Gulf 1819, Plassey, Pondicherry, Punjab Frontier, Punjaub, Punniar, Pyrenees
- Quebec 1759, Queenstown
- Ramillies, Relief of Kimberley, Relief of Ladysmith, Reshire, Rohilcund 1774, Rohilcund 1794, Rolica
- Sahagun, Salamanca, Samana, San Sebastian, Saskatchewan, Scinde, Seedaseer, Seetabuldee, Seringapatam, Sevastopol, Sholinghur, Sierra Leone 1898–1899, Sobraon, Somaliland 1901–04, South Africa 1835, South Africa 1846–7, South Africa 1851–52–53, South Africa 1877–8–9, South Africa 1899–1902, St Helena, St Lucia 1778, St Lucia 1796, St Lucia 1803, St Vincent 1797, Suakin 1885, Surinam
- Taku Forts, Talavera, Tangier 1662–80, Tangier 1680, Tarifa, Tel el Kebir, Ternate, The Saints, Tirah, Tofrek, Toulouse, Tournay, Transkei 1877–9, Transkei 1880–81
- Villers en Cauchies, Vimiera, Vittoria
- Wandewash, Warburg, Waterloo, West Africa 1887, West Africa 1892–3–4, Wilhelmstahl, Willems

== The Great War ==
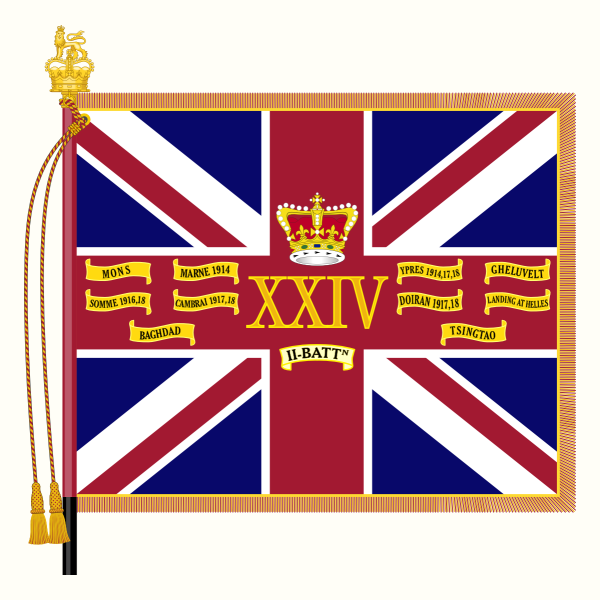
Queen's Colour of the 2nd Battalion, 24th Regiment of Foot, presented in 1880 to replace the colour destroyed at Isandlwana and later emblazoned with 10 honours selected from those won by the South Wales Borderers in the Great War.

- Aden, Agagiya, Aisne 1914, Aisne 1918, Albert (Beaumont Hamel) 1916, Albert 1916, Albert 1918, Albert 1918 (Chuignes), Amiens, Amiens 1918, Ancre 1916, Ancre 1918, Ancre Heights, Anzac, Archangel, Arleux, Armentières 1914, Arras 1917, Arras 1918, Aubers, Avre
- Baghdad, Bailleul, Baku, Baluchistan 1918, Banyo, Bapaume 1917, Bapaume 1918, Basra, Bazentin, Beaurevoir, Behobeho, Bellewaarde, Bethune, Bligny, Bois des Buttes, Broodseinde, Bullecourt
- Cambrai 1917, Cambrai 1918, Cameroons 1914–16, Cameroons 1915–16, Canal du Nord, Coutrai, Ctesiphon
- Damascus, Defence of Anzac, Defence of Kut al Amara, Delville Wood, Doiran 1917, Doiran 1918, Drocourt-Quéant, Duala, Dukhovskaya
- East Africa 1914–16, East Africa 1914–17, East Africa 1914–18, East Africa 1915–17, East Africa 1916–17, East Africa 1916–18, East Africa 1917–18, East Africa 1918, Egypt 1915, Egypt 1915–16, Egypt 1915–17, Egypt 1916, Egypt 1916–17, El Mughar, Epehy, Estaires
- Festubert 1914, Festubert 1915, Flers Courcelette, France and Flanders 1914, France and Flanders 1914–15, France and Flanders 1914–16, France and Flanders 1914–18, France and Flanders 1915, France and Flanders 1915–16, France and Flanders 1915–18, France and Flanders 1916–17, France and Flanders 1916–18, France and Flanders 1917–18, France and Flanders 1918, Frezenberg
- Gallipoli 1915, Gallipoli 1915–16, Gallipoli 1916, Garua, Gaza, Gaza-Beersheba, Gheluvelt, Gibeon, Ginchy, Givenchy 1914, Gravenstafel, Guillemont
- Hamel, Havrincourt, Hazebrouck, Helles, Herbertshohe, Hill 60, Hill 60 (Anzac), Hill 70, Hindenburg Line, Hooge 1915
- Italy 1917–18, Italy 1918
- Jaffa, Jericho, Jerusalem, Jordan, Jordan (Amman), Jordan (Es Salt)
- Kamina, Kemmel, Khan Baghdadi, Kilimanjaro, Kosturino, Krithia, Kut al Amara 1915, Kut al Amara 1917
- La Bassée 1914, Landing at Anzac, Landing at Helles, Landing at Suvla, Langemarck 1914, Langemarck 1917, Le Cateau, Le Transloy, Loos, Lys
- Macedonia 1915–16, Macedonia 1915–17, Macedonia 1915–1918, Macedonia 1916–1917, Macedonia 1916–1918, Macedonia 1917, Macedonia 1917–1918, Macedonia 1918, Magdhaba-Rafah, Maghdaba-Rafah, Marne 1914, Marne 1918, Megiddo, Menin Road, Merv, Mesopotamia 1914–18, Mesopotamia 1915–17, Mesopotamia 1915–18, Mesopotamia 1916 '18, Mesopotamia 1916–17, Mesopotamia 1916–18, Mesopotamia 1917–18, Messines 1914, Messines 1917, Messines 1918, Mons, Mont St Quentin, Morval, Mount Sorrel, Murman 1918–19
- N.W. Frontier, India 1914, N.W. Frontier, India 1914 '15 '16–17, N.W. Frontier, India 1914–15 '17, N.W. Frontier, India 1914–1917, N.W. Frontier, India 1915, N.W. Frontier, India 1915 '16, N.W. Frontier, India 1915 '16–17, N.W. Frontier, India 1915 '17, N.W. Frontier, India 1916–17, N.W. Frontier, India 1917, Nablus, Narungombe, Nebi Samwil, Neuve Chapelle, Nonne Boschen, Nyangao
- Oppy
- Palestine 1917–18, Palestine 1918, Passchendaele, Persia 1915–19, Persia 1918, Persia 1918–19, Persian Gulf, Piave, Pilckem, Poelcappelle, Polygon Wood, Pozières, Pursuit to Mons
- Rafah, Retreat from Mons, Rosières, Rumani
- Sambre, Sambre (Le Quesnoy), Sari Bair, Sari Bair-Lone Pine, Scarpe 1917, Scarpe 1918, Scherpenberg, Scimitar Hill, Selle, Shaiba, Sharon, Sharqat, Siberia 1918–19, Soissonais-Ourcq, Somme 1916, Somme 1918, South West Africa 1914–15, St. Julien, St Quentin Canal, St. Quentin, St. Quentin 1918, Struma, Suez Canal, Suvla
- Tardenois, Tell 'Asur, The Great War, Thiepval, Tigris 1916, Tigris 1917, Troitsa, Tsingtao
- Valenciennes, Villers-Bretonneux, Vimy 1917, Vittorio Veneto
- Waziristan 1917
- Ypres 1914, Ypres 1915, Ypres 1917, Ypres 1918

== Between the Wars ==
- Afghanistan 1919
- Haifa-Aleppo 1919
- Iraq 1920
- North West Frontier 1930, North West Frontier 1936–37, North West Frontier 1937–40

== The Second World War ==
Queen's Colour of the 1st Battalion, the Black Watch, showing the 20 honours selected to be emblazoned from those awarded for the two World Wars

- 42nd Street
- Aam, Aart, Abau-Malin, Abyssinia 1940, Abyssinia 1940–41, Abyssinia 1941, Acroma Keep, Ad Teclesan, Adele River, Adrano, Adriatic, Advance on Tripoli, Advance to Florence, Advance to the Tiber, Advance to Tiber, Afodu, Agedabia, Agira, Agordat, Ahwaz 1941, Akarit, Alam el Halfa, Alamein Box, Alamein Defence, Alem Hamza, Alem Hamza 1942, Alessandra, Alethangyaw, Aliakmon Bridge, Aller, Allerona, Alpe di Vitigliano, Amba Alagi, Ambazzo, Amboga River, Ambon, Amiens 1940, Amiens 1944, Ancona, Antwerp, Antwerp-Turnhout Canal, Anumb River, Anvers-Canal de Turnhout, Anzio, Apeldoorn, Aprilia, Aquino, Aradura, Arakan Beaches, Arezzo, Argenta Gap, Argoub el Megas, Argoub Sellah, Arnhem 1944, Arnhem 1945, Arras Counterattack, Artillery Hill, Artlenberg, Assab, Assoro, Asten, Athens, Augusta, Authie, Ava, Awash
- Babile Gap, Bad Zwischenahn, Baghdad 1941, Bagnoregio, Balif, Balikpapan, Banana Ridge, Baranello, Bardia 1941, Bardia 1942, Barentu, Barkasan, Barum, Battalgia, Battipaglia, Batu Pahat, Beaufort, Beda Fomm, Beles Gugani, Belhamed, Benghazi, Benghazi Raid, Bentheim, Ber Rabal, Berbera, Best, Best Post, Bir el Aslagh, Bir el Igela, Bir Enba, Bir Hacheim, Bishenpur, Bisidimo, Bobdubi I, Bobdubi II, Bogadjim, Bologna, Bonis-Porton, Bordj, Borgo Santa Maria, Borneo, Bou Arada, Bou Ficha, Boulogne 1940, Boulogne 1944, Bourguébus Ridge, Brailos Pass, Bremen, Breskens Pocket, Bretteville-L'Orgueilleuse, Bréville, Brieux Bridgehead, Brinkum, British Somaliland 1940, Brunei, Bruneval, Brussels, Bulgaria Village, Bulo Erillo, Bumi River, Buna-Gona, Buq Buq, Burma 1942, Burma 1942 '44, Burma 1942 '44–45, Burma 1942–1945, Burma 1942–43, Burma 1942–44, Burma 1943, Burma 1943 '45, Burma 1943–44, Burma 1943–45, Burma 1944, Burma 1944–45, Burma 1945, Busu River, But Dagua, Buthidaung
- Caen, Cagny, Calabritto, Calais 1940, Calais 1944, Caldari, Cambes, Campobasso, Campoleone, Camposanto Bridge, Campriano, Canea, Cape Endaiadere-Sinemi Creek, Cappezano, Capture of Forli, Capture of Halfaya Pass 1942, Capture of Meiktila, Capture of Naples, Capture of Perugia, Capture of Ravenna, Capture of Tobruk, Cardito, Carmusa, Carpineta, Carpiquet, Carroceto, Casa Bettini, Casa Fabbri Ridge, Casa Fortis, Casa Sinagogga, Casale, Cassel, Cassino I, Cassino II, Cassino Railway Station, Castel di Sangro, Castel Frentano, Castle Hill, Catarelto Ridge, Catenanuova, Catheolles, Cauldron, Cava di Tirreni, Celieno, Celle, Central Malaya, Centuripe, Ceprano, Cerasola, Cerbala, Ceriano Ridge, Cerrone, Cesena, Chambois, Chaussée de Walcheren, Chebket en Nouiges, Cheux, Chindits 1943, Chindits 1944, Chiusi, Chor es Sufan, Citerna, Citta della Pieve, Citta di Castello, Clair Tizon, Cleve, Colito, Colle Cedro, Colle d'Anchise, Combolcia, Commando Road, Conventello-Comacchio, Coriano, Corinth Canal, Cos, Cosina Canal Crossing, Crete, Crête de Bourguébus, Crête de Verrières-Tilly-la-Campagne, Creteville Pass, Croce, Cub Cub
- Dalet, Damiano, Darara, Débarquement à Reggio, Débarquement en Normandie, Débarquement en Sicile, Defence of Alamein Line, Defence of Arras, Defence of Escaut, Defence of Habbaniya, Defence of Kohima, Defence of Lamone Bridgehead, Defence of Meiktila, Defence of Rauray, Defence of Scarlet Beach, Defence of Sinzweya, Defence of Tobruk, Deir el Munassib, Deir el Shein, Delfzijl Pocket, Derna, Derna Aerodrome, Deventer, Dieppe, Diredawa, Dives Crossing, Djebel Abiod, Djebel Alliliga, Djebel Ang, Djebel Azzag 1942, Djebel Azzag 1943, Djebel bech Chekaoui, Djebel bel Mahdi, Djebel bou Aoukaz 1943 I, Djebel bou Aoukaz 1943 II, Djebel Choucha, Djebel Dahra, Djebel Djaffa, Djebel Djaffa Pass, Djebel el Meida, Djebel el Rhorab, Djebel el Telil, Djebel es Srafi, Djebel Garci, Djebel Guerba, Djebel Kesskiss, Djebel Kournine, Djebel Rmel, Djebel Roumana, Djebel Tanngoucha, Djebel Tebaga, Djebel Terhouna, Djebibina, Djedeida, Donbaik, Dreirwalde, Dunkerque 1944, Dunkirk 1940, Dunkirk 1944, Dyle
- East Africa 1940–41, Efogi-Menari, Egan's Ridge-Hongorai Ford, Egyptian Frontier 1940, El Adem Road, El Agheila, El Alamein, El Hadjeba, El Hamma, El Kourzia, El Mechili, El Mreir, El Wak, El Yibo, Elasson, Emmerich-Hoch Elten, Enfidaville, Eora Creek-Templeton's Crossing I, Eora Creek-Templeton's Crossing II, Er Regima, Esquay, Estry, Europe 1939–45
- Faenza Pocket, Falaise, Falaise Road, Falluja, Faubourg de Vaucelles, Femmina Morta, Ficulle, Fiesole, Fike, Filo, Finisterres, Finschhafen, Florence, Flushing, Fondouk Pass, Fontenay le Pesnil, Forêt de Bretonne, Forêt de la Londe, Forêt de Nieppe, Fort Dufferin, Fort McGregor, Fossa Cembalina, Fossacesia, Fosso Munio, Fosso Vecchio, Foundouk, Francofonte, French Frontier 1940, Friesoythe, Frisoni, Fuka, Fuka Airfield
- Gab Gab Gap, Gabbione, Gabr el Fachri, Gabr Saleh, Gaiana Crossing, Galatas, Gallabat, Gambatesa, Gambela, Gangaw, Garigliano Crossing, Gash Delta, Gazala, Geilenkirchen, Gelib, Gemas, Gemmano Ridge, Gerbini, Gheel, Giarabub, Giarso, Goch, Goch-Calcar Road, Gogni, Goluin, Gona, Gondar, Goodenough Island, Gothic Line, Grammichele, Granarolo, Greece 1941, Greece 1944–45, Green Islands, Greve, Grich el Oued, Grik Road, Gromballa, Groningen, Gubi I, Gubi II, Gueriat el Atach Ridge, Gusika, Gusika-Fortification Point, Gustav Line
- Hagiag er Raml, Haka, Halfaya 1941, Halfaya Pass, Hammam Lif, Hangman's Hill, Hari River, Hawain River, Hechtel, Heidous, Heppen, Heraklion, Hill 112, Hitler Line, Hochwald, Hong Kong, Hongorai River, Htizwe, Hunt's Gap
- Ibbenburen, Idice Bridgehead, IJsselmeer, Il Castello, Imphal, Impossible Bridge, Incontro, Ioribaiwa, Ipoh, Iraq 1941, Irrawaddy, Isurava, Italie 1943–1945, Italy 1943, Italy 1943 '45, Italy 1943–1944, Italy 1943–1945, Italy 1943–44, Italy 1943–45, Italy 1944, Italy 1944–1945, Italy 1944–45, Italy 1945
- Jail Hill, Java, Jebel Dafeis, Jebel Shiba, Jemaluang, Jessami, Jitra, Jivenaneng-Kumawa, Johore, Juba
- Kaboibus-Kiarivu, Kairouan, Kaladan, Kalewa, Kalueng River, Kama, Kampar, Kangaw, Kanglatongbi, Kapelsche Veer, Karora-Marsa Taclai, Kasserine, Kef el Debna, Kef Ouiba Pass, Kennedy Peak, Kennels, Keren, Keren-Asmara Road, Knightsbridge, Koepang, Kohima, Kokoda Deniki, Kokoda Trail, Komiatum, Kota Bharu, Kuantan, Kulkaber, Küsten Canal, Kvam, Kyaukmyaung Bridgehead, Kyaukse 1942, Kyaukse 1945
- L'Avance à Florence, L'Escaut, L'Orne, La Foce, La Laison, La Rhénanie, La Touques Crossing, La Varinière, La Vie Crossing, Lababia Ridge, Labuan, Lae Road, Lae-Nadzab, Laha, Laison, Lamone Bridgehead, Lamone Crossing, Landing at Porto San Venere, Landing at Reggio, Landing in Sicily, Le Havre, Le Hochwald, Le Mesnil Patry, Le Perier Ridge, Le Ravin, Le Reichswald, Le Rhin, Le Sangro, Lechemti, Leer, Leese, Lentini, Leonforte, Leopold Canal, Leros, Letse, Liberation of Australian New Guinea, Libya & Egypt 1942, Ligne Gothique, Ligne Gustav, Ligne Hitler, Ligne Rimini, Ligne Trasimene, Lingen, Liri Valley, Lisieux, Litan, Longstop Hill 1942, Longstop Hill 1943, Lower Maas
- Madagascar, Madang, Magwe, Maknassy, Malaya 1941–42, Malaya 1942, Maleme, Malleto, Malta 1940, Malta 1940–42, Malta 1941–42, Malta 1942, Maltot, Mandalay, Mao Songsang, Maprik, Marda Pass, Mareth, Marradi, Marsa Belafarit, Massa Tamourini, Massa Vertecchi, Massawa, Matapau, Matmata Hills, Maungdaw, Mawaraka, Mawlaik, Maymyo, Mayu Tunnels, Mayu Valley, Medecina, Medenine, Medjez el Bab, Medjez Plain, Mega, Meijel, Meiktila, Melfa Crossing, Menate, Mergueb Chaouach, Mersa el Brega, Mersa Matruh, Merville Battery, Mescelit Pass, Meuse Inferieure, Middle East 1941, Middle East 1941–44, Middle East 1942, Middle East 1943, Middle East 1944, Milford Highway, Milne Bay, Mine de Sedjenane, Minqar Qaim, Minturno, Miri, Misano Ridge, Mivo Ford, Mivo River, Mobiai River, Moerbrugge, Moerkerke, Mogaung, Molos, Monastery Hill, Mont Pincon, Montagne Farm, Montarnaud, Monte Calvo, Monte Camino, Monte Casalino, Monte Cavallo, Monte Ceco, Monte Cedrone, Monte Chicco, Monte Colombo, Monte della Gorgace, Monte Domini, Monte Farneto, Monte Fili, Monte Gabbione, Monte Gamberaldi, Monte Grande, Monte Gridolfo, Monte la Difensa-Monte la Remetanea, Monte la Pieve, Monte Lignano, Monte Luro, Monte Majo, Monte Majone, Monte Malbe, Monte Maro, Monte Ornito, Monte Pezza, Monte Pianoereno, Monte Piccolo, Monte Porro del Bagno, Monte Querciabella, Monte Reggiano, Monte Rivoglia, Monte Rotondo, Monte Salvaro, Monte San Bartolo, Monte San Marco, Monte San Michele, Monte Scalari, Monte Sole Caprara, Monte Spaduro, Monte Stanco, Monte Stella, Monte Tuga, Monte Vigese, Montebello-Scorticata Ridge, Montecchio, Monteciccardo, Montegaudio, Montescudo, Montilgallo, Montone, Montorsoli, Monywa 1942, Monywa 1945, Mosigetta, Motta Montecorvino, Mount Olympus, Mount Popa, Mount Shiburangu-Mount Tazaki, Mount Tambu, Mowdok, Moyale, Moyland, Moyland Wood, Mozzagrogna, Mt. Engiahat, Muar, Mubo I, Mubo II, Myebon, Myinmu, Myinmu Bridgehead, Myitson, Myohaung
- Naga Village, Nambut Ridge, Nassau Bay, Naviglio Canal, Nederrijn, Neerpelt, Ngakyedauk Pass, Nijmegen, Niyor, Nofilia, Noireau Crossing, Nongora, Normandy Landing, North Africa 1940, North Africa 1940 '43, North Africa 1940–41, North Africa 1940–41 '43, North Africa 1940–42, North Africa 1940–43, North Africa 1941, North Africa 1941 '43, North Africa 1941–42, North Africa 1941–43, North Africa 1942, North Africa 1942–43, North Africa 1943, North Arakan, North-West Europe 1940, North-West Europe 1942, North-West Europe 1944, North-West Europe 1944–5, North-West Europe 1945, Northern Malaya, Norway 1940, Norway 1941, Noyers, Nungshigum, Nyaungu Bridgehead
- Odon, Ogorata River, Oivi-Gorari, Oldenburg, Olympus Pass, Omars, Omo, Oos-Afrika 1940–41, Opheusden, Orne, Orsara, Orsogna, Ortona, Otta, Oudna, Oued Zarga, Ourthe
- Pabu, Passage du Lamone, Paula Line, Paungde, Pearl Ridge, Pegasus Bridge, Pegu 1942, Pegu 1945, Perano, Perembil, Pergola Ridge, Persia 1941, Peter's Corner, Pian di Castello, Pian di Maggio, Piazza Arminera, Pichon, Pideura, Piedimonte Hill, Pignataro, Pinwe, Pisciatello, Plaine du Waal, Platamon Tunnel, Po Valley, Poggio del Grillo, Poggio San Giovani, Point 1433, Point 171, Point 174, Point 201 (Arakan), Point 201 (Roman Wall), Point 204, Point 204, Point 551, Point 59, Point 93, Port en Bessin, Potenza, Pothus, Pozzo Alto Ridge, Pratelle Pass, Primosole Bridge, Proasteion, Puriata River, Pursuit to Messina, Putot en Bessin, Pyawbwe, Pyinmana
- Qasr Sheikh, Qattara Track, Quarry Hill, Quesnay Wood
- Rabaul, Ragoubet Souissi, Ramree, Ramu Valley, Rangoon Road, Rathedaung, Razabil, Regalbuto, Reichswald, Relief of Kohima, Relief of Tobruk 1941, Retimo, Retma, Rhine, Rhineland, Rimini Line, Rio Fontanaccia, Ripa Ridge, Risle Crossing, Robaa Valley, Rocca d'Arce, Rocchetta e Croce, Roer, Romagnoli, Rome, Route de la Falaise, Ru-Ywa, Ruweisat, Ruweisat Ridge
- Saar, Sagaing, Saint André-sur-Orne, Sakawng, Salerno, Salerno Hills, Salso Crossing, Samananda Road, San Clemente, San Fortunato, San Leonardo, San Marino, San Martino-San Lorenzo, San Martino-Sogliano, San Michele, San Nicola-San Tommaso, San Nicolo Canal, San Salvo, Sanananda Road, Sanananda-Cape Killerton, Sanfatucchio, Sangro, Sangshak, Sant'Angelo in Salute, Santa Lucia, Santarcangelo, Santerno Crossing, Sanyet el Miteirya, Sarteano, Sattelberg, Savignano, Savio Bridgehead, Savojaards Plaat, Sbiba, Scafati Bridge, Scarlet Beach, Schaddenhof, Scheldt, Sebkret en Noual, Sedjenane I, Seikpyu, Seine 1944, Senio, Senio Floodbank, Senio Pocket, Servia Pass, Sferro, Sferro Hills, Shaggy Ridge, Shandatgyi, Shenam Pass, Shwebo, Shwegyin, Shweli, Si Abdallah, Si Mediene, Sicile 1943, Sicily 1943, Sidi Ahmed, Sidi Ali, Sidi Aziez, Sidi Barrani, Sidi Nsir, Sidi Rezegh 1941, Sidi Rezegh 1942, Sidi Suleiman, Siki Cove, Sillaro Crossing, Simeto Bridgehead, Simeto Crossing, Singapore Island, Singu, Sio, Sio-Sepik River, Sittang 1942, Sittang 1945, Slater's Knoll, Slim River, Solarino, Sollum, Solomons, Somme 1940, Soroppa, Soter, Soudia, Souleuvre, South Beveland, South East Asia 1941, South East Asia 1941–42, South Pacific 1942–44, South West Pacific 1942, South West Pacific 1942, South West Pacific 1942–45, South West Pacific 1942–43, South West Pacific 1942–44, South West Pacific 1942–45, South West Pacific 1943, South West Pacific 1943–44, South West Pacific 1943–45, South West Pacific 1944–45, South West Pacific 1945, Southern France, St André-sur-Orne, St Angelo in Teodice, St Lambert sur Dives, St Lucia, St Nazaire, St Omer-La Bassée, St Pierre la Vielle, St Valery-en-Caux, Steamroller Farm, Stien, Stockades, Stuka Farm, Sully
- Tadjera Khir, Taieb el Essem, Takrouna, Tamandu, Tambu Bay, Tamera, Tamu Road, Tanlwe Chaung, Tarakan, Taranto, Taukyan, Taungtha, Taungup, Tavoleto, Teano, Tebaga Gap, Tebourba, Tebourba Gap, Tehamiyam Wells, Tel el Eisa, Tell el Makh Khad, Tempe Gorge, Tengnoupal, Termoli, Thaia, The Dadaba, The Gully, The Hochwald, The Juba, The Laison, The Lower Maas, The Moro, The Orne, The Orne (Buron), The Reichswald, The Rhine, The Rhineland, The Roer, The Salient 1941, The Sangro, The Scheldt, The Tiber, Tiddim Road, Tilly sur Seulles, Tinma, Tobruk 1941, Tobruk 1942, Tobruk Sortie, Tobruk Sortie 1941, Todenyang-Namaraputh, Tomba di Pesaro, Tongzang, Torella, Torre-Mucchia, Torrice Crossroads, Tossignano, Toungoo, Tourmauville Bridge, Traghetto, Trasimene Line, Treasury Islands, Trestina, Trigno, Troarn, Troina Valley, Tsimba Ridge, Tug Argan, Tuitum, Tunis, Tuori, Twente Canal, Two Tree Hill
- Uelzen, Ukhrul, Um Hagar
- Vaagsö, Valguarnera, Vallée de la Liri, Vallée du Troina, Valli di Commacchio, Veen, Veghel, Vella Lavella, Venlo Pocket, Venraij, Verrières Ridge-Tilly-la-Campagne, Veve, Via Balbia, Vietri Pass, Villa Grande, Villers Bocage, Vist, Vizzini, Volturno Crossing
- Waal Flats, Wadara, Wadi Akarit East, Wadi Zeuss East, Wadi Zigzaou, Waitavolo, Wal Garis, Walcheren Causeway, Wareo, Wareo-Lakona, Wau, Weeze, West Borneo 1941–42, West Point 23, Western Desert 1941–3, Westkapelle, Wewak, Wirui Mission, Withdrawal to Cherbourg, Withdrawal to Matruh, Withdrawal to Sphakia, Withdrawal to the Escaut, Withdrawal to the Seine, Woensdrecht, Wolchefit, Wormhoudt, Wyneghem
- Xanten
- Yamil-Ulupu, Yenangyaung 1942, Yenangyaung 1945, Yonte, Ypres-Comines Canal, Yu
- Zemia, Zemlet el Lebene, Zetten, Zt el Mrasses, Zutphen

== British awards after 1945 ==
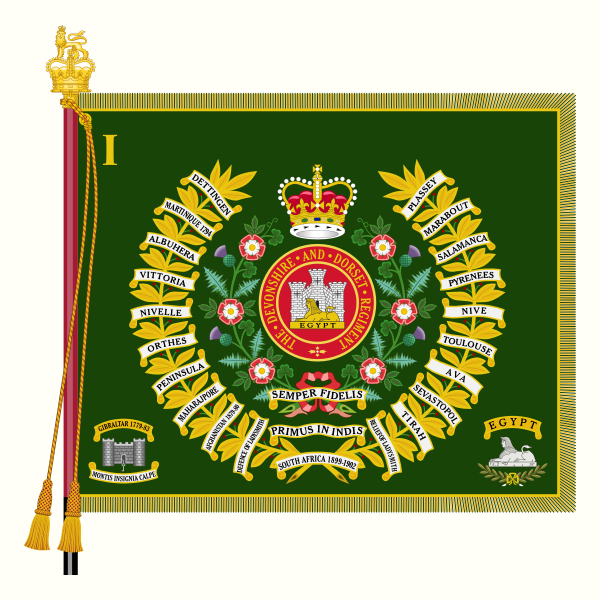
Regimental Colour of the 1st Battalion, the Devonshire and Dorset Regiment. Representative of the period of mass amalgamations of the line infantry regiments following the 1957 Defence White Paper, this colour bears the honours and mottos of its antecedent regiments (the Devonshire Regiment and the Dorset Regiment).

Korean War

- Chong Chon II, Chongyu, Chuam-Ni
- Hill 227 I, Hill 327
- Imjin
- Kapyong-Chon, Korea 1950–53,
- Yongyu
- Uijongbu
- Kapyong, Kowang-San
- Maehwa-San, Maryang-San,
- Naktong Bridgehead
- Pakchon
- Samichon, Sariwon, Seoul
- The Hook 1952, The Hook 1953,

Cambodian Civil War

- Cambodia 1970

Falklands War

- Falkland Islands 1982
- Goose Green (1982)
- Tumbledown Mountain
- Mount Longdon

Gulf War

- Gulf 1991
- Wadi al Batin
- Western Iraq

International Security Assistance Force, Afghanistan

- Afghanistan 2001-2014

Iraq War

- Iraq 2003
- Western Iraq 2003
- Al Basrah

== See also ==
- RAF battle honours
- Battle honours of South Africa and List of South African Battle Honours
- Battle and theatre honours of the Indian Army and Repugnant battle honours of the Indian Army
- Battle and theatre honours of the Australian Army

== Bibliography ==
- Adjutant General's Office (1844). Regulations and Orders for the Army (Queen's Regulations). London: Parker, Furnivall and Parker.
- Adjutant-General's Office (1857). Regulations for the Dress of General, Staff, and Regimental Officers of The Army (Dress Regulations). London: HMSO.
- Army Council (1912). Regulations for the Territorial Force, and for County Associations. London: HMSO.
- Baker, A.H.R (1986). Battle Honours of the British and Commonwealth Armies. Shepperton: Ian Allan.
- Barnett, Correlli (1970). Britain and Her Army 1509−1970. London: Allen Lane.
- Cannon, Richard (1848). Historical Record Of The Eighteenth, Or The Royal Irish Regiment Of Foot. London: Parker, Furnivall and Parker.
- Doyle, Peter and Foster, Chris (2010). British Army Cap Badges of the First World War. Oxford: Shire Publications.
- Cruttwell, C.R.M.F. (1934). A History of the Great War 1914−1918. Oxford: Clarendon Press.
- Farwell, Byron (2001). Encyclopedia of 19th Century Land Warfare: An Illustrated World View. New York: W. W. Norton & Company.
- Norman, C.B. (1911). Battle Honours of the British Army : from Tangier, 1662, to the Commencement of the Reign of King Edward VII. London: Murray.
- Robson, Brian (2011). Swords of the British Army: The Regulation Patterns 1788 to 1914, Revised Edition. Uckfield: The Naval and Military Press.
- Rodger, Alexander (2003). Battle Honours of the British Empire and Commonwealth Land Forces. Marlborough: The Crowood Press.
- Singh, Sarbans (1993). Battle Honours of the Indian Army 1757–1971. New Delhi: Vision Books.
- Strachan, Hew (1983). European Armies and the Conduct of War. London: George Allen & Unwin.
- Sumner, I. and Hook, R. (2001a). British Colours & Standards 1747–1881 (1): Cavalry. Oxford: Osprey.
- Sumner, I. and Hook, R. (2001b). British Colours & Standards 1747–1881 (2): Infantry. Oxford: Osprey.
- Swinson, Arthur (1972). A Register of the Regiments and Corps of the British Army: The ancestry of the regiments and corps of the Regular Establishment of the Army. London: The Archive Press.
- Terraine, John (1965). The Great War 1914–1918. London: Hutchinson.
- Wood, S.C. (2001). Battle honours in The Oxford Companion To Military History ed. Richard Holmes. Oxford: Oxford University Press.
