= Battle and theatre honours of the Australian Army =

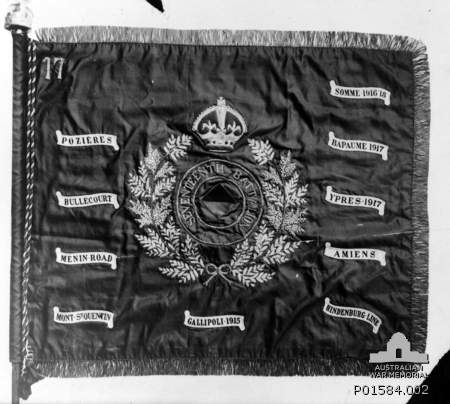
Colours of the 17th Battalion in 1918, listing its battle honours from the First World War.

The Australian Army and its forerunners have been awarded 248 battle and theatre honours since its formation. The first honour given to an Australian unit came prior to Federation and was awarded to forces from the colony of New South Wales, which contributed a small contingent consisting of an infantry battalion, with artillery and support units to take part in the short-lived British campaign against the Dervish revolt in the eastern Sudan in 1885 following the death of General Charles Gordon at Khartoum.

The next conflict that saw Australian units receive battle or theatre honours was the Second Boer War. Between 1899 and 1901, forces from the six Australian colonies fought alongside each other before being replaced in 1901 by forces of the newly established Australian Army following Federation. A total of five theatre honours were awarded for service in South Africa, being bestowed upon successor units in the form of honorary banners and distinctions presented in 1904, 1908 and 1911. Since then, the Australian Army has received honours for fighting during the First World War, the Second World War, the Korean War and the Vietnam War, with the Royal Australian Regiment last being awarded a battle honour in 1994 for the First Battle of Maryang San in Korea. In 2013, units of Special Operations Command were awarded the battle honour Eastern Shah Wali Kot for their actions in Afghanistan in May and June 2010. A theatre honour for peacekeeping in East Timor in 1999–2003 was awarded to the Army on its 119th birthday in March 2020. The most highly decorated unit in the Australian Army is the 12th/40th Battalion, Royal Tasmania Regiment (12/40 RTR), with 47 battle and theatre honours. It is an active Australian Army Reserve Infantry unit. The 12th/40th Battalion, Royal Tasmania Regiment, is part of 4 Brigade, with battalion headquarters at Anglesea Barracks, Hobart, with Alpha Company based in Launceston at Youngtown Barracks and Bravo Company being based in Hobart at Derwent Barracks.

== Sudan (1885) ==
- Suakin 1885

== South Africa (1899–1902) ==
- South Africa 1899–1902
- South Africa 1899–1900
- South Africa 1900–1902
- South Africa 1901–1902
- South Africa 1902

== First World War (1914–18) ==
=== German New Guinea ===
- Herbertshöhe

=== Gallipoli ===
- Helles
- Krithia
- Anzac
- Landing at Anzac
- Defence of Anzac
- Suvla
- Sari Bair – Lone Pine
- Gallipoli 1915

=== Egypt ===
- Suez Canal
- Rumani
- Magdhaba – Rafah
- Egypt 1915–17

=== Palestine ===
- Gaza – Beersheba
- El Mughar
- Nebi Samwil
- Jerusalem
- Jaffa
- Jericho
- Jordan (Es Salt)
- Jordan (Amman)
- Megiddo
- Sharon
- Nablus
- Damascus
- Palestine 1917–18

=== Western Front ===
- Somme 1916
- Pozières
- Bapaume 1917
- Arras 1917
- Bullecourt
- Messines 1917
- Ypres 1917
- Menin Road
- Polygon Wood
- Broodseinde
- Poelcappelle
- Passchendaele
- Somme 1918
- Arras 1918
- Avre
- Ancre 1918
- Villers-Bretonneux
- Lys
- Hazebrouck
- Kemmel
- Hamel
- Marne 1918
- Tardenois
- Amiens (Note: The 13th Light Horse Regiment was awarded the battle honour "Amiens 1918" in 1927. This appears to be unique, with all other British and Dominion units involved in the battle receiving the honour "Amiens".)
- Albert 1918 (Chuignes)
- Mont St Quentin
- Hindenburg Line
- Epehy
- St Quentin Canal
- Beaurevoir
- France and Flanders 1916–1918

== Second World War (1939–45) ==
=== North Africa ===
- North Africa 1940–42
- Bardia 1941
- Capture of Tobruk
- Derna
- Giarabub
- Er Regima
- Defence of Tobruk
- El Adem Road
- The Salient 1941
- Tobruk 1941
- Belhamed
- Defence of Alamein Line
- Tel el Eisa
- Ruweisat Ridge
- Tell el Makh Khad
- Sanyet et Miteirya
- Qattara Track
- Alam el Halfa
- West Point 23
- El Alamein

=== Greece ===
- Greece 1941
- Mount Olympus
- Servia Pass
- Tempe Gorge
- Veve
- Soter
- Brailos Pass

=== Middle East ===
- Middle East 1941
- Crete
- Canea
- Heraklion
- Retimo
- 42nd Street
- Withdrawal to Sphakia

=== Syria ===
- Syria 1941
- Syrian Frontier
- The Litani
- Merjayun
- Adlun
- Sidon
- Jezzine
- Damascus (1941)
- Wadi Zeini
- Dimas
- Chehim and Rharife
- Damour
- Mazraat ech Chouf
- Hill 1069
- Badarene
- Jebel Mazar

=== Malaya ===
- Malaya 1941–42
- Johore
- Gemas
- The Muar
- Jemaluang
- Singapore Island

=== South West Pacific ===
- South West Pacific 1942
- South West Pacific 1942–43
- South West Pacific 1942–44
- South West Pacific 1942–45
- South West Pacific 1943
- South West Pacific 1943–44
- South West Pacific 1943–45
- South West Pacific 1944–45
- South West Pacific 1945
- Koepang
- Ambon
- Laha
- Rabaul
- Java 1942
- Kokoda Trail
- Kokoda – Deniki
- Isurava
- Eora Creek – Templeton's Crossing I
- Efogi – Menari
- Ioribaiwa
- Eora Creek – Templeton's Crossing II
- Oivi – Gorari
- Buna – Gona
- Gona
- Sanananda Road
- Amboga River
- Cape Endaiadere – Sinemi Creek
- Sanananda – Cape Killerton
- Milne Bay
- Goodenough Island
- Wau
- Mubo I
- Bobdubi I
- Lababia Ridge
- Bobdubi II
- Nassau Bay
- Mubo II
- Mount Tambu
- Tambu Bay
- Komiatum
- Lae – Nadzab
- Busu River
- Lae Road
- Finschhafen
- Scarlet Beach
- Bumi River
- Defence of Scarlet Beach
- Jivenaneng – Kumawa (Note: The correct spelling is "Jivevaneng"; however, when the battle honour was awarded in 1961 by the Australian Army it appears to have been misspelt as "Jivenaneng".)
- Siki Cove
- Sattelberg
- Pabu
- Gusika
- Wareo
- Nongora
- Liberation of Australian New Guinea
- Ramu Valley
- Shaggy Ridge
- Finisterres
- Barum
- Bogadjim
- Madang
- Kalueng River
- Wareo – Lakona
- Gusika – Fortification Point
- Sio
- Sio – Sepik River
- Matapau
- Perembil
- Abau – Malin
- Nambut Ridge
- Balif
- Anumb River
- But – Dagua
- Maprik
- Hawain River
- Wewak
- Wirui Mission
- Mount Shiburangu – Mount Tazaki
- Yamil – Ulupu
- Kaboibus – Kiarivu
- Tsimba Ridge
- Bonis – Porton
- Artillery Hill
- Pearl Ridge
- Adele River
- Mawaraka
- Mosigetta
- Puriata River
- Darara
- Slater's Knoll
- Hongorai River
- Egan's Ridge–Hongorai Ford
- Commando Road
- Hari River
- Ogorata River
- Mobiai River
- Mivo River
- Mivo Ford
- Waitavolo
- Borneo
- Tarakan
- Brunei
- Labuan
- Beaufort
- Miri
- Balikpapan
- Milford Highway

== Korea (1950–53) ==
- Sariwon
- Yongyu
- Chongju
- Pakchon
- Uijeongbu
- Chuam-ni
- Maehwa-San
- Kapyong
- Kowang-San
- Maryang-San
- The Samichon
- Korea 1950–53

== Malaya (1955–63) ==
- Malayan Emergency: Malayan Emergency 1955-63

== Malaysia (Confrontation) (1964–66) ==
- Malaysia (Confrontation): Malaysia (Confrontation) 1964-1966

== Vietnam (1962–72) ==
- Long Tan
- Bien Hoa
- Coral–Balmoral
- Hat Dich
- Binh Ba
- Vietnam 1965–72
- Vietnam 1968–72

== East Timor (1999–2003) ==
- East Timor 1999–2003

== Afghanistan (2001–21) ==
- Eastern Shah Wali Kot

== Iraq (2003–2011) ==
- Iraq

== See also ==
- Battle honours of the British and Imperial Armies

== Notes ==
Footnotes

Citations
