= Rose Creal =

Australian nurse (1865–1921)

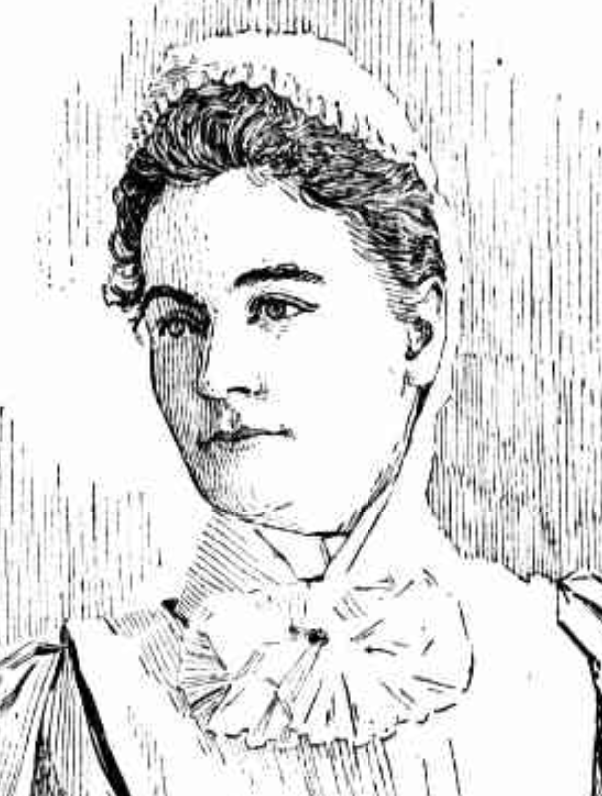
- Creal in c. 1899, on her appointment as matron of Sydney Hospital
- Born: 3 November 1865; Young, New South Wales
- Died: 7 August 1921 (aged 55); Sydney Hospital, Sydney, New South Wales
- Burial place: Waverley Cemetery
- Military career
- Allegiance: Australia
- Branch: Australian Imperial Force
- Service years: 1914–1920
- Rank: Matron
- Unit: Australian Army Nursing Service
- Conflicts: First World War
- Awards: Royal Red Cross

Rose Ann Creal, RRC (3 November 1865 – 7 August 1921) was a decorated Australian nurse of the First World War.

== Early life ==
Creal was born on 3 November 1865 in Young, New South Wales. She was one of five children of John Creal, an Irish-born miner, and Ann (née Brady), also of Irish descent. In 1872, when Rose was seven years old, her mother and newborn brother died. She was educated at home by her father until the age of 16 when she began a job in a small hospital in Parkes, New South Wales.

Creal worked in Parkes for many years and was appointed as a member of the Australian Army Nursing Service Reserve. She enlisted for war service on 14 August 1916 and arrived in Egypt on 23 September. She served as a nurse for three years during the First World War and returned to Australia in January 1920. She died almost a year and a half later, on 7 August 1921, after an attack of appendicitis.

== Nursing ==
Creal began working at a small hospital in Parkes at the young age of 16. The matron of the hospital described Creal as "a diamond of the first water". Recognizing the quality and potential of her young assistant, the matron arranged for Creal to be taken on as a probationer at Sydney Hospital. By 1891 Creal was head nurse of a ward. When the hospital's matron resigned in 1898, Senior Sister Creal was made acting matron. Her appointment was confirmed in February 1899 and later that year she became a founding member and councillor of the Trained Nurses' Association of New South Wales.

Nurses who joined the Australian Army Nursing Service during peacetime and attended prescribed lectures were the first to be called upon when the First World War broke out in August 1914. These civilian trained nurses, including Creal, were known as 'efficient'. Creal became the principal matron of the 2nd Military District. Creal's role was to complete her main duties and she, like a number of hospital matrons, was feeling the effects of nursing staff shortages due to the high levels of nursing recruits to the war effort.

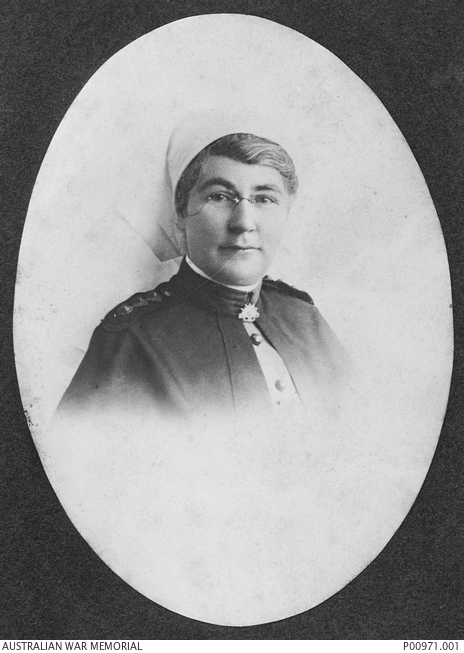
Matron Creal in Egypt during the First World War

== First World War ==
On 14 August 1916, Matron Creal enlisted for war service overseas, nominating her sister Elizabeth (‘Bessie’) as her next of kin. She worked on the hospital ship Karoola on 19 August 1916 and started her duty as matron of No. 14 Australian General Hospital at Abbassia, Egypt, on 23 September. The casualties of the Australian Light Horse were treated as a priority, and in November 1916 were up to about 570 people.

Following heavy fighting at Magdhaba and Rafa the casualties rose to over 900 and, by May 1917, after the battle of Gaza, to 1140. Due to the large number of casualties it placed great pressure on the nursing staff. In her report for September 1917, Creal paid tribute to the nurses' selfless devotion to duty, after the first battle of Gaza when some of the nurses worked for eighteen hours at a time. When the hospital moved to Port Said in February 1918, Creal was known for the way she welcomed the injured soldiers as they arrived at the hospital and dedicated herself to their care. H.S. Gullett said "No womanhood has ever presented a richer association of feminine tenderness and shear capacity".

== Awards and recognition ==
For her work in Egypt, Creal was awarded the Royal Red Cross (First class) in the 1919 New Year Honours. In August and September 1919 she completed an elocution course and tour of hospitals in England and Scotland "with the view of becoming conversant in the latest methods employed in these countries".

Sydney Hospital established the Rose Creal Medal in her honour; it is the highest award for students of the Lucy Osborn School of Nursing.

Creal Place, in the Canberra suburb of Chisholm, is named in her honour.

== Death ==
Creal died at Sydney Hospital on 7 August 1921 from appendicitis. She was accorded a military funeral, one or the largest funerals the city had seen in a long time. Hundreds of people attended the funeral lining the streets outside St James' church. Creal's coffin was mounted on a gun carriage and draped with the Union Jack, with her nurse's cap on top. Burial was at Waverley Cemetery.
