= Korah (Battle honour) =

Battle honour of the British Army

Korah was a battle honour awarded to units of the forces of British India that took part in the Battle of Korah in 1776.

In May, 1776, a British force under Lieut-Col John Neville Parker was sent from Belgram, in Oudh, to monitor the activities of one Mabub Khan, a disaffected officer of the Nawab of Oudh, stationed at Korah (about 25 miles from Cawnpore) with seven battalions of troops and 19 guns. On June 10, 1776, Col Parker sent a demand that the guns be surrendered and, when this demand was refused, the British attacked. In a brief, but bloody, engagement, Mabub Khan's troops were defeated and the guns captured.

The award was made to the 1st and 10th Regiments of Bengal Native Infantry.

== See also ==
- Battle honours of the British and Imperial Armies
