= Aden (battle honour) =

Battle honour

Aden was a battle honour awarded to units of the British and Imperial Armies that took part in either of the following campaigns:

- The Aden Expedition, January 1839
- The Campaign in South Arabia during the Great War, July 1915 to October 1918

This award is unusual in that it was awarded for two entirely unconnected campaigns, undifferenced by year.
