= Egypt (battle honour) =

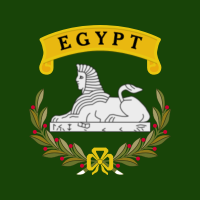
Badge of the Sphinx as typically displayed on a British Army Regimental Colour

Egypt was a battle honour awarded to units of the British and Indian armies that took part in the British expedition to Egypt under the command of General Sir Ralph Abercromby (and later General John Hely-Hutchinson) between 8 March and 26 August 1801, towards the end of the French campaign in Egypt and Syria. It was awarded to British units with the badge of the Sphinx and initially to Indian units simply as Egypt. Later, the badge of the Sphinx was taken into use by Indian units also.

Engagements during the expedition included:

- Battle of Aboukir
- Battle of Mandora (also awarded in its own right)
- Battle of Alexandria
- Siege of Fort Julien
- Siege of Cairo
- Siege of Alexandria (Marabout was awarded to the 54th Foot, later the 2nd Battalion, the Dorsetshire Regiment)

== Bibliography ==
- Rodger, Alexander (2003). Battle Honours of the British Empire and Commonwealth Land Forces. Marlborough: The Crowood Press.
