= Battle of Pakchon =

Battle of the Korean War

Coordinates: 39°39′32″N 125°35′29″E

- Part of the Korean War
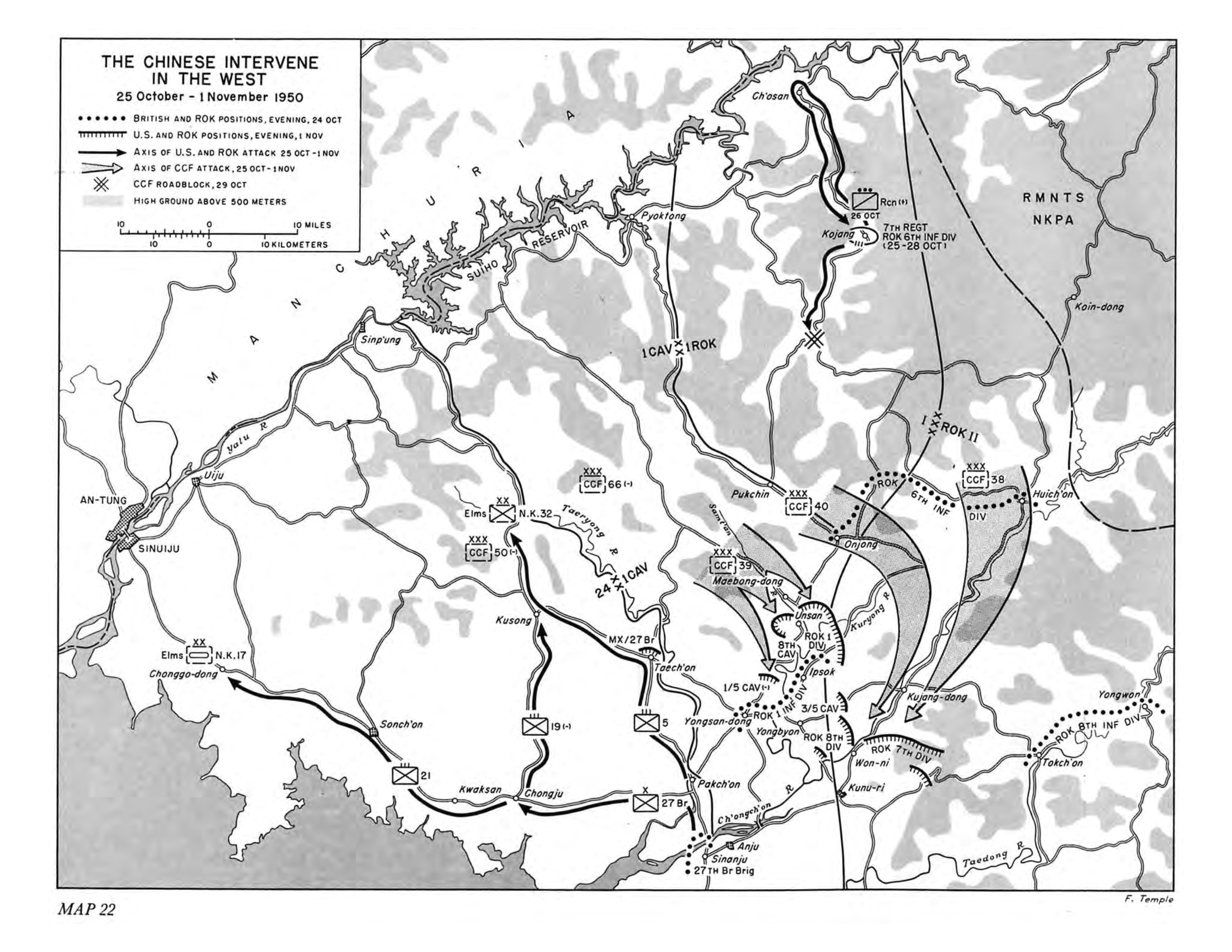
- Chinese First Phase Offensive, 25 October – 1 November 1950
Date	5 November 1950
Location	Pakchon, North Korea
Result	United Nations victory

Belligerents
United Nations: United States; United Kingdom; Australia	China; North Korea

Commanders and leaders
(United Kingdom) Basil Aubrey Coad (Australia) Floyd Walsh (United States) Howard M. Moore	Wu Xinquan; Zhang Jiecheng

Units involved
(United Kingdom) 27th Brit Com Bde: (Australia) 3 RAR; (United Kingdom) 1 ASHR; (United Kingdom) 1 MR	117th Division

Strength
~300 men	~1,500 men

Casualties and losses
14 killed 84 wounded	200 killed 200 wounded (UN estimate)

The Battle of Pakchon (5 November 1950), also known as the Battle of Bochuan (Chinese: 博川战斗; pinyin: Bó Chuān Zhàn Dòu), took place ten days after the start of the Chinese First Phase Offensive, following the entry of the Chinese People's Volunteer Army (PVA) into the Korean War. The offensive reversed the United Nations Command (UN) advance towards the Yalu River which had occurred after their intervention in the wake of the North Korean invasion of South Korea at the start of the war. The battle was fought between British and Australian forces from the 27th British Commonwealth Brigade with American armour and artillery in support, and the PVA 117th Division of the 39th Army, around the village of Pakchon on the Taeryong River. After capturing Chongju on 30 October the British and Australians had been ordered to pull back to Pakchon in an attempt to consolidate the western flank of the US Eighth Army. Meanwhile, immediately following their success at Unsan against the Americans, the PVA 117th Division had attacked southward, intending to cut off the UN forces as they withdrew in the face of the unexpected PVA assault. To halt the PVA advance, the 27th British Commonwealth Brigade was ordered to defend the lower crossings of the Taeryong and Chongchon rivers as part of a rearguard, in conjunction with the US 24th Infantry Division further upstream on the right.

During the night of 4/5 November, the PVA and Korean People's Army (KPA) mounted a full-scale assault on the US 24th Infantry Division, pushing back an American infantry regiment nearly 2 kilometres (1.2 mi). The PVA/KPA force subsequently turned west, advancing between the Taeryong and Chongchon rivers and threatening the rear of the 27th British Commonwealth Brigade by cutting the Pakchon–Sinanju road. The following day they attacked an American artillery battery which was guarding a vital concrete bridge near Kujin. The British and Australians then successfully counter-attacked the PVA forces occupying a number of nearby ridgelines during the day but were in turn counter-attacked before being pushed off the high ground during the night. In their first battle with the PVA, the 3rd Battalion, Royal Australian Regiment (3 RAR) captured a well defended hill with only limited offensive support, and held it in the face of heavy counter-attacks before confused command decisions resulted in a disorganised night withdrawal while still in contact. The withdrawal threatened to open the 27th British Commonwealth Brigade's left flank and the Australians were ordered to immediately reposition on the ridge, yet ultimately it was too late to regain the feature in darkness. However, following heavy fighting the pressure on the Australians unexpectedly ceased after midnight, and parties of PVA were observed beginning to withdraw. By early morning the PVA attack had been checked and 3 RAR had redeployed to new positions in the paddy fields around the railway crossing north of Maenjung-dong.

The fighting was costly for both sides. Although the Australians halted the advancing PVA 117th Division and inflicted numerous casualties on them, they also suffered heavy losses. In the aftermath the inexperienced Australian battalion commander—Lieutenant Colonel Floyd Walsh—was relieved of his position by the British brigade commander, having taken over just six days earlier following the death of the previous commanding officer Lieutenant Colonel Charles Green at Chongju. Nonetheless, the 27th British Commonwealth Brigade succeeded in preventing a PVA break-through at Pakchon, keeping open vital withdrawal routes across the river and securing the UN left flank. Suffering significant casualties, the PVA offensive was halted the next day due to logistic difficulties. The PVA and KPA were temporarily forced to withdraw north, while the UN successfully reinforced its positions, holding on the Chongchon Line. Yet by late November the US Eighth Army was again forced to withdraw after the PVA began their Second Phase Offensive, starting a long retreat south. The UN forces withdrew from North Korea to the 38th Parallel where they sought to re-establish defensive positions.

== Background ==
=== Military situation ===
The Korean War began early in the morning of 25 June 1950, following the surprise invasion of the Republic of Korea by its northern neighbour, the communist Democratic People's Republic of Korea (DPRK). Numerically superior and better-equipped, the KPA crossed the 38th Parallel and rapidly advanced south, easily overcoming the inferior Republic of Korea Army (ROK). In response, the United Nations decided to intervene on behalf of South Korea, inviting member states to send forces to restore the situation. As a consequence, American ground forces were hastily deployed in an attempt to prevent the South Koreans from collapsing; however, they too were under-strength and poorly equipped, and by early August had been forced back by the KPA to an enclave around Pusan, known as the Pusan Perimeter. Key US allies—Britain, Canada and Australia—also committed forces, although these were initially limited to naval contingents and were largely viewed as token efforts in the US. Under diplomatic pressure the British agreed to deploy an infantry brigade in July, and would later dispatch a second brigade as the crisis worsened. The Canadians also agreed to provide an infantry brigade, although the first battalion, the 2nd Battalion, Princess Patricia's Canadian Light Infantry (2 PPCLI), would not arrive at the front lines from a six-week training course until February 1951. A total of 21 UN member states eventually contributed forces.

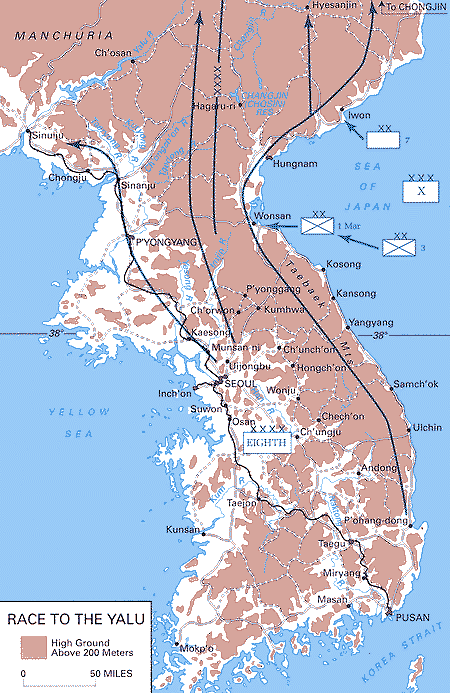
Map of the UN advance toward the Yalu River, 1950

Australia was one of the first nations to commit units to the fighting, playing a small but sometimes significant part in the UN forces, which were initially led by General Douglas MacArthur. Volunteer soldiers deployed in Japan as part of the British Commonwealth Occupation Force (BCOF) formed the basis of the Australian response, with P-51 Mustang fighter-bombers from No. 77 Squadron RAAF flying their first missions on 2 July, while the frigate HMAS Shoalhaven and the destroyer HMAS Bataan were also committed to naval operations. During this time the 3rd Battalion, Royal Australian Regiment (3 RAR), which had been preparing to return to Australia prior to the outbreak of the war, remained in Japan, however on 26 July the Australian government announced that it would also commit the under-strength and poorly equipped infantry battalion to the fighting, following a period of preparation. Training and re-equipment began immediately, while hundreds of reinforcements were hastily recruited in Australia as part of K Force; they soon began arriving to fill out the battalion. The battalion's commanding officer, Lieutenant Colonel Floyd Walsh, was replaced by Lieutenant Colonel Charles Green. An officer with extensive operational experience fighting the Japanese in New Guinea during the Second World War, Green took over from Walsh due to the latter's perceived inexperience.

On 23 September 1950, 3 RAR embarked for Korea, concentrating at Pusan on 28 September. There it joined the British 27th Infantry Brigade, a garrison formation hurriedly committed from Hong Kong by the British as the situation deteriorated around the Pusan Perimeter in late August to bolster the US Eighth Army under Lieutenant General Walton Walker. Commanded by Brigadier Basil Coad, the brigade was renamed the 27th British Commonwealth Brigade and consisted of the 1st Battalion, Argyll and Sutherland Highland Regiment (1 ASHR), the 1st Battalion, Middlesex Regiment (1 MR) and 3 RAR. Under-strength, the two British battalions had each mustered just 600 men of all ranks, while the brigade was also short on transport and heavy equipment, and had no integral artillery support, for which it would rely entirely on the Americans until the 16th Field Regiment, Royal New Zealand Artillery arrived in January 1951. As such, with a strength of nearly 1,000 men, the addition of 3 RAR gave the brigade increased tactical weight as well as expediently allowing the Australians to work within a familiar organisational environment, rather than being attached to a US formation.

By the time 3 RAR arrived in the theatre, the KPA had been broken and were in rapid retreat, with MacArthur's forces conducting a successful amphibious assault at Inchon and breakout from the Pusan Perimeter on the southern tip of the Korean peninsula. A steady advance began, driving the North Koreans northwards towards the 38th Parallel. The 27th British Commonwealth Brigade was attached to the US 1st Cavalry Division, under the command of Major General Hobart R. Gay. On 16 October the brigade took over as the vanguard of the UN advance into North Korea. Although the KPA had suffered heavily in the preceding weeks, they continued to resist strongly. The 27th British Commonwealth Brigade moved 70 kilometres (43 mi) from Kumchon County, with the Argylls capturing Sariwon on 17 October, killing 215 KPA and taking many prisoners for the loss of one man killed and three wounded. The British and Australians then passed to the command of the US 24th Infantry Division on 21 October, under the overall command of Major General John H. Church, while the US 1st Cavalry Division remained in Pyongyang to complete its capture. The brigade was ordered to seize Chongju.

The advance continued north with little respite, and on 22 October the Australians fought their first major action at Yongju, killing 150 KPA and capturing 239 of the brigade's 800 prisoners, for the loss of seven men wounded. Intending to defeat the KPA and bring the war to a close, the UN forces pushed towards the Yalu River, on the Chinese border. The brigade crossed the Chongchon River, moving towards Pakchon. On 24 October, MacArthur had removed all restrictions on the movement of his forces south of the Yalu River and prepared for the final phase of the advance, defying a directive of the US Joint Chiefs of Staff and risking Chinese intervention in support of North Korea. On 25 October 3 RAR crossed the Taeryong River. The KPA attacked the forward Australian companies at Kujin early the following morning, resulting in Australian losses of eight killed and 22 wounded. However, the KPA suffered heavy casualties including over 100 killed and 350 captured, and the Australians succeeded in defending the bridgehead after the KPA withdrew. Intelligence indicated that the British and Australians were facing the KPA 17th Tank Brigade, which was preparing a last line of defence at Chongju, 70 kilometres (43 mi) away. With the war considered all but over the 27th British Commonwealth Brigade continued to pursue the KPA towards Chongju; however, the advance increasingly encountered strong resistance as they approached the Manchurian border. From 29 to 30 October 3 RAR fought the Battle of Chongju. KPA casualties included 162 killed and 10 captured, while Australian losses were nine killed and 30 wounded, including Green, who died of wounds on 1 November.

== Prelude ==
=== Opposing forces ===
Following the capture of Chongju the US 21st Infantry Regiment had set off rapidly along the road to Sonchon to the west. Encountering only one strong KPA position which they quickly turned, by noon on 1 November the lead battalion had reached Chonggodong, just 30 kilometres (19 mi) from the Yalu River where the Americans clashed with another KPA armoured force. To the north meanwhile, the US 5th and 9th Infantry Regiments of the US 24th Infantry Division secured Taechon and Kusong, before advancing to within 40 kilometres (25 mi) of the Manchurian border. However, during the last weeks of October the Chinese had moved 18 PVA divisions across the Yalu River under the overall command of Marshal Peng Dehuai in order to reinforce the remnants of the KPA. Undetected by US and South Korean intelligence, the PVA 13th Army Group crossed the border on 16 October and penetrated up to 100 kilometres (62 mi) into North Korea, and were reinforced in early November by 12 divisions from the PVA 9th Army Group; in total 30 divisions composed of 380,000 men. The PVA ambushed MacArthur's forces which were now widely dispersed, decimating ROK II Corps at Onjong and encircling and overrunning the US 8th Cavalry Regiment at Unsan. With the US 24th Infantry Division ordered back to the Chongchon River as a result, the 27th British Commonwealth Brigade also began moving south.

Ultimately Chongju was the furthest north that the 27th British Commonwealth Brigade was to penetrate, and on 1 November, while still in divisional reserve, the brigade was ordered to pull back to Pakchon in an attempt to consolidate the western flank. Immediately following their success at Unsan, the PVA 117th Division, under the overall command of Zhang Jiecheng—attacked southward, intending to cut off the retreating UN forces and in so doing eliminate the remnants of the ROK 1st Infantry Division and US 1st Cavalry Division by cutting the road junction at Pakchon. (Note: Zhang Jiecheng was the commander of PVA 117th Division.) (Note: In Chinese military nomenclature, the term "Army" (军) means Corps, while the term "Army Group" (集团军) means Field Army.) Meanwhile, the PVA 38th and 40th Armies approached along the Chongchon River from the east. 3 RAR remained at Chongju, however, due to a lack of transport, while the remainder of the brigade moved south; now the most forward element on the US Eighth Army's left flank, the battalion soon became isolated without communications or armour and artillery support. Finally, on 2 November, US Army trucks became available, and the battalion completed its move south without incident, harbouring in the bed of the Taeryong River that evening. Meanwhile, it was announced that Green would be temporarily replaced by Walsh, who he had himself replaced in Japan several months before. Walsh, by then an observer at US Eighth Army headquarters, was urgently posted back to 3 RAR to resume command, despite his lack of operational experience as an infantry commander. Taking over amid difficult circumstances following Green's death, and with little time to become acquainted with the battalion, Walsh's inexperience soon told as the local situation deteriorated.

"In order to capture the enemies at Yongsan-dong and Yongbyong, you must infiltrate boldly, cutting the Yongsan-dong–Pakchon and Yongbyong–Anju roads, prevent the enemies from escaping, [and] surround the enemies..."
Peng Dehuai's order to the Chinese 39th Army.

Walker elected to stand north of the Chongchon and Taeryong rivers in response to the PVA offensive, and the following day Coad received new orders to hold the left forward section of the bridgehead over the Chongchon. To halt the PVA advance, the 27th British Commonwealth Brigade was ordered to defend the lower crossings of the Taeryong and Chongchon rivers as part of a rearguard, in conjunction with the US 24th Infantry Division further upstream on the right. The brigade concentrated in the Pakchon area. The Middlesex occupied the town and the high ground to the north and east, while 3 RAR and the Argylls held positions covering the western approaches to the Taeryong, with the latter designated as the brigade reserve. Yet the information available to the British and Australians suggested that the PVA would likely attack from an easterly direction, and the dispositions adopted by Coad were later criticised for failing to take this into account. 3 RAR took up a defensive position 1.5 kilometres (0.93 mi) west of the village, where it remained for the next two days. Meanwhile, B and C Companies of the Argylls formed a bridgehead over the Taeryong around the far-side of the partially destroyed bridge near Kujin, while A Company occupied positions astride the road to the south. To the right, the US 24th Infantry Division covered the crossing over the Chongchon at Anju, while ROK II Corps held positions further east. Forced to defend on a wide frontage, the UN positions were weakened by a 9.5-kilometre (5.9 mi) gap between the 27th British Commonwealth Brigade and the nearest American formation—2nd Battalion, US 19th Regimental Combat Team (2/19 RCT)—on the brigade's eastern flank.

== Battle ==
=== Opening moves, 4/5 November 1950 ===
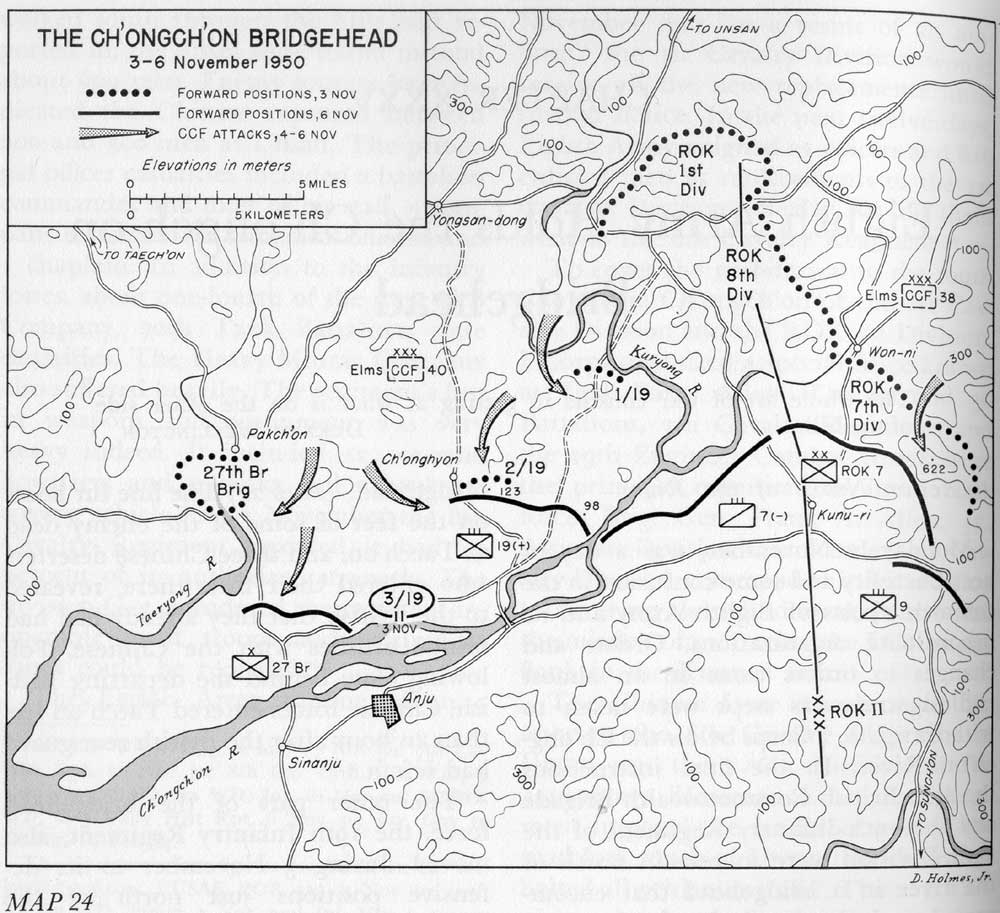
The Chongchon Bridgehead, 3–6 November 1950

During the night of 4/5 November 1950, the PVA and KPA mounted a full-scale assault on US 24th Infantry Division. Before dawn, 19 RCT had become heavily engaged, and was pushed back nearly 2 kilometres (1.2 mi). The PVA force turned west to advance between the Taeryong and Chongchon rivers, threatening the rear of the 27th British Commonwealth Brigade by cutting the Pakchon–Sinanju road. The previous afternoon a patrol from the Middlesex had clashed with a large PVA patrol 9.6 kilometres (6.0 mi) to the north-east and suffered a number of casualties, yet the main PVA attack did not come until early the next morning. Meanwhile, large numbers of refugees continued to move south, causing the British and Australians further concern given the possibility that they might be used by the PVA to cover the infiltration of their positions. At 08:00 on 5 November a group of around 200 PVA attacked C Battery, US 61st Field Artillery Battalion, which was attached to the 27th British Commonwealth Brigade. The American guns had been supporting the brigade from a position beside the road about 3 kilometres (1.9 mi) south of Pakchon, and were protecting the vital concrete bridge 1.8 kilometres (1.1 mi) south of the Argyll's battalion headquarters at Kujin.

The PVA established a number of roadblocks in the area before proceeding to assault the American gun line and the nearby bridge. The attack cut the road to Anju which was the 27th British Commonwealth Brigade's single means of resupply or withdrawal, and exposed the only available crossing over the Chongchon River. Coad considered that unless the PVA could be cleared from the gun position and the hills secured, the brigade was in danger of being surrounded and cut off and the crossing at Anju lost, while US 19 RCT would also be threatened. Under the command of Lieutenant Colonel George Neilson, the Argylls were despatched to restore the situation. B and C Companies would be drawn back from the west bank of the Taenyong to reinforce A Company, and then attack south one after the other supported by American tanks. At the same time A Company—under Major Alexander Wilson—was ordered to immediately attack north to clear the road. Hasty control measures were put in place to avoid the possibility of the two forces accidentally engaging one another, while air support was requested at 08:40. After commandeering two American trucks, Wilson's men stepped off with four US M4 Sherman tanks in support.

Meanwhile, to the north, under the command of Captain Howard M. Moore, C Battery, US 61st Field Artillery formed its six 105 mm M2A1 howitzers into a semi-circle and created a perimeter around them, strongly defending their positions with automatic weapons from behind their gun shields. Assaulting from the east, the PVA attempted to infiltrate the gun-line using a number of creek beds and paddy bunds for concealment. One of the American howitzers was depressed and brought into action, firing over open sights at point-blank range, bouncing shells off the frozen paddy fields which then exploded among the assaulting troops. A second howitzer was turned around 45 minutes later, augmenting the fire of the first. The Americans expended 1,400 rounds at a range of between 45 and 270 metres (49 and 295 yd); however, the weight of fire was insufficient to halt the assaulting force. Supporting fire from a nearby battery was directed by a spotter aircraft overhead, and this temporarily stemmed the PVA onslaught. Running low on small arms ammunition and having lost one howitzer destroyed as well as two men killed and seventeen wounded, the Americans faced the prospect of being overrun. The gunners killed a member of a PVA demolition team just 18 metres (20 yd) from the bridge. Finally, after crossing the Taeryong in single file under fire, B and C Companies of the Argylls began to systematically clear the road supported by machine-gun fire from the Middlesex, while A Company also continued to advance. At 09:00 the lead tanks and infantry of the relief force arrived, closely followed by the remainder of A Company. The Argylls rapidly cleared the gun position and the PVA withdrew north along the railway to a nearby hill while the American tanks continued to engage them. Over 70 PVA dead were found in the vicinity of the gun-line, however, from their new position the PVA continued to dominate the road.

In order to open the road the Argylls moved to clear the PVA off the high ground located 500 to 1,000 metres (550 to 1,090 yd) east of the road. The hill, about 45 metres (49 yd) high, offered clear fields of fire to the west over the paddy fields to the Taeryong River and dominated the Pakchon–Sinanju road running beside the river. Supported by four Sherman tanks, machine-guns and mortars, A Company captured the hill at 10:00. Wilson occupied the summit with a reinforced platoon, before withdrawing the remainder of the company to the road, where the 3-inch mortar and Vickers medium machine-gun sections were established. Meanwhile, B Company—under the command of Major Alastair Gordon-Ingram—attacked the second PVA roadblock, again supported by a number of American tanks. Back in action, the guns from C Battery also fired in support of the British infantry, and after a vigorous engagement in which Gordon-Ingram was wounded the PVA were compelled to withdraw, leaving many of their dead on the road. A number were later found to have been carrying demolition charges, presumably for use against the bridge at Anju. With the survivors of the battle seen moving into the hills, Neilson then ordered B and C Companies to establish positions on the eastern flank in order to protect the road. Although the PVA had been cleared from the gun-line and the hills around Pakchon, further attacks to the south continued to threaten the 27th British Commonwealth Brigade's position, which remained perilous. The fighting continued, and at 11:00 the PVA mounted a heavy counter-attack on the A Company outpost, wounding six men. The Argylls were then forced to withdraw from the high ground under the cover of sustained fire from two Vickers machine-guns sited on the road, and became pinned down on the reverse slope.

Throughout the morning a United States Air Force (USAF) LT-6G Mosquito light observation aircraft had continued to monitor growing concentrations of PVA in hills to the rear of the 27th British Commonwealth Brigade, with reports indicating their strength at approximately one division. Determining that the PVA would move to cut the road during the night and believing it dangerous to remain any further forward than required, Coad requested approval for a limited withdrawal. He decided to pull his forward units back across the Taeryong River, before moving south towards the Chongchon River, near Anju. The brigade counter-attacked the PVA forces occupying the nearby ridgelines in order to clear the route south. The plan envisioned the Argylls holding the road open, while 3 RAR recaptured the high ground previously held by A Company, 1 ASHR. The Middlesex would then pass through to clear and occupy the hills east of Maengjung-dong, while the Argylls—as the brigade rearguard—would follow to occupy the right of the new defensive position. The brigade would then adopt a tight defensive perimeter on the hills overlooking the north bank, so as to maintain the bridgehead over the river. Meanwhile, still in position west of Pakchon, the Australians prepared to cross the Taeryong River to regain the lost position, 7.5 kilometres (4.7 mi) to their south. 3 RAR faced a difficult approach after moving beyond the river, with the battalion's route paralleling the disputed ridge which overlooked it 800 metres (870 yd) to the east.

=== 3 RAR assaults the ridgeline, 5 November 1950 ===
The Australians crossed the Taeryong at 11:30 and began preparations to assault PVA positions on the ridgeline 1 kilometre (0.62 mi) east of the road to Pakchon and 2 kilometres (1.2 mi) north of Maenjung-dong. In support were four P-51 Mustang fighter-bombers from No. 77 Squadron RAAF which attacked the PVA with rockets and machine-gun fire, one of only a few occasions during the war when Australian aircraft operated in support of 3 RAR. There were three main crests on the ridge running south-east, the first being nearest the road, the second just to its rear, and the third further back still, with the PVA occupying the first two. Although the Argylls had occupied the ridgeline briefly during the morning, they had been pushed off by the PVA. Mortar fire fell on 3 RAR while it was forming up; however, using the road as a start line the battalion attack began at 14:00, with A Company on the left flank and B Company on the right, each with two platoons forward and one back in reserve, each in extended line with bayonets fixed. A Company was commanded by Captain Bill Chitts, while B Company was led by Captain D'arcy Laughlin, after Major George Thirlwell had broken his leg in a vehicle accident two days before. The Mortar Platoon was sited with battalion headquarters alongside the road, with two sections of Vickers machine guns and two 17 pounder anti-tank guns from the Anti-Tank Platoon. The Assault Pioneer Platoon provided local defence, while the mortars laid down a continuous barrage in an attempt to counter the PVA mortar fire in conjunction with the machine guns and tanks which began to engage the hilltop.

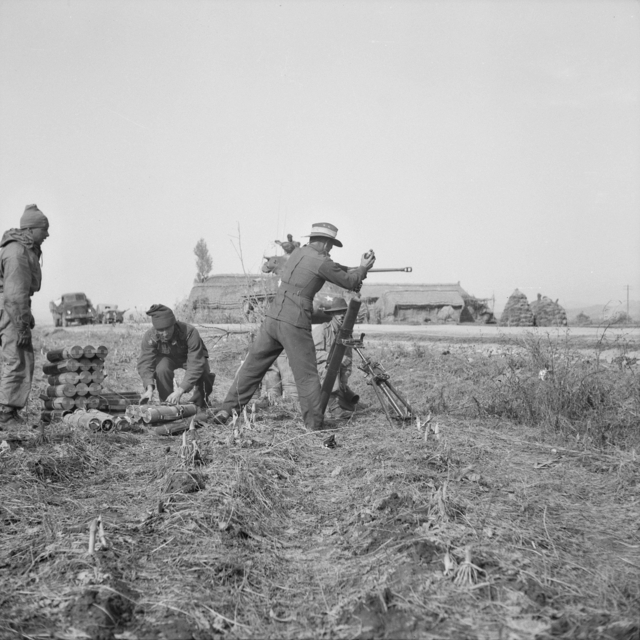
Australian mortar crew in action at Pakchon, 5 November 1950

Beginning their advance, the Australians began to suffer casualties; yet they were initially unable to confirm the location of the PVA. However, as they commenced their ascent they were met by heavy small arms fire from the higher ground to the south and east. After a long approach across 500 metres (550 yd) of open paddy field, A Company relieved the beleaguered Argylls. The PVA then forced the two Australian companies to fight hard in order to gain the 50-metre (55 yd) crest. Lacking artillery support, the Australians instead relied on the battalion's integral support weapons, with 3-inch mortars and medium machine-guns in support, as well as four Sherman tanks which provided fire support from a stand-off position near the road. With A and B Companies heavily engaged, Walsh moved D Company—under the command of Major Walter Brown—to attack the hill to the south to reinforce the right flank. A Company succeeded in establishing itself on the first crest, forcing the PVA from the position, while supporting fire from their Bren light machine guns and Vickers medium machine-guns allowed B Company to move up on their right and capture the second crest. Finally at 16:00, after two hours of heavy fighting, the Australians had achieved their objectives against a determined defence. A and B Company prepared for a counter-attack by the PVA. Meanwhile, C Company—under Captain Archer Denness—had remained in reserve on the road with battalion headquarters and Support Company.

Although orders for the attack had been hurried and lacking in detail, and the strength of the defenders unknown, the assaulting force had prevailed, securing the ridge with only limited offensive support. During the fighting one of the B Company platoon commanders, Lieutenant Eric Larsen, who had only the week before led the crossing at Kujin, was killed. One of the section commanders, Corporal Jeff Jones, immediately took command of the 5 Platoon assault, moving from section to section across the steep slope to direct their fire, even while under heavy PVA mortar and machine-gun fire. He was awarded the US Silver Star for his actions. The successful assault opened the road south, enabling the Middlesex battalion, brigade headquarters and a number of supporting units to withdraw down the road through the Australians, followed by the Argylls. 3 RAR remained behind as a rearguard while the British battalions took up new positions, covering the Chongchon River crossing at Anju. PVA mortars and machine-gun fire continued to fall on 3 RAR, and at 17:00 a round destroyed the A Company headquarters, killing two men and wounding four others, including Chitts who was evacuated by stretcher.

Coad ordered 3 RAR to consolidate its positions and to secure the railway bridge; however, with all his companies committed there were no troops available for the latter task and Walsh chose to ignore the order. Meanwhile, the Middlesex occupied a hill north-east of Maenjung-dong, which was found to be clear except for one minor feature occupied by the PVA, while the Argylls moved south with a platoon of tanks and positioned themselves on a small group of hills, 4 kilometres (2.5 mi) east of Maenjung-dong. From here the brigade was able to dominate the Pakchon–Maenjung-dong–Anju road. Meanwhile, as the light began to fade the administrative elements of the formation and the US 61st Field Artillery Battalion were moved south of the Chongchon River amid a bitter wind. The British and Australians stood-to from dusk until nightfall, and after posting sentries the remainder of the brigade began their night routine.

=== Walsh withdraws from the high ground, 5/6 November 1950 ===
An hour after last light on 5 November the PVA attacked C Company 3 RAR—the forward Australian company occupying positions astride the Pakchon road 3 kilometres (1.9 mi) north of Maenjung-dong—with mortars and machine-guns. Meanwhile, machine-gun fire also fell on Support Company and battalion headquarters, 400 metres (440 yd) to the south. Walsh decided to relocate his headquarters 900 metres (980 yd) further to the rear. The PVa infantry launched a strong attack against C Company assaulting them across the paddy fields in darkness, while simultaneously also falling upon A and B Companies holding the hills they had captured during the afternoon. In the face of the heavy PVA counter-attack Walsh feared the loss of his entire force, and at 20:00 he ordered a general withdrawal, pulling them back off the ridgeline in order to concentrate the battalion on the road, without informing Coad. Ordered in the dark and with one company still under attack, a disorganised night withdrawal occurred. The decision proved to be a serious tactical error, for as was to be demonstrated often in the months that followed, the PVA were skilled at moving across the hills to outflank road-bound UN forces who often failed to hold the ridges on either side of the roads only to be confronted by strong concentrations in front and behind them as a result. The withdrawal threatened to open the 27th British Commonwealth Brigade's left flank; recognising the danger this posed, Coad ordered Walsh to immediately reposition his companies on the ridge. Ultimately this proved unachievable.

A Company—now under Lieutenant Lawrence Clark following Chitts' wounding that afternoon—had only just succeeded in breaking contact from the PVA, suffering a number killed and wounded during a confused withdrawal. Meanwhile, B Company had also been forced to fight its way down the hill. Both companies were now well clear of their former positions and would have had a hard time fighting their way back. Ultimately it was too late for the Australians to regain the feature in darkness, and the weight of the PVA attack continued to mount. Only D Company on the southern right flank—which had been left unmolested—was able to regain its previous position on Hill 63. Meanwhile, the positions previously occupied by A and B Companies were occupied by the PVA in superior numbers, and the remainder of 3 RAR concentrated at the railway crossing instead. At 22:00 Coad arranged to shell and mortar the relinquished ridge, while a standing patrol from the Middlesex was posted on the south-western side of the Maenjung-dong pass in anticipation of a renewed PVA attack. However, following heavy fighting the pressure on the Australians unexpectedly ceased after midnight, and parties of PVA were observed beginning to withdraw.

By 02:00 the PVA attack had been checked and 3 RAR had redeployed to new positions in the paddy fields around the railway crossing north of Maenjung-dong. However, amid the confusion the exact dispositions of the companies remained unclear for the remainder of the night. Australian losses were 12 killed and 64 wounded, the same number as those suffered during their entire advance into North Korea. A number of officers of the battalion were later critical of the decision to withdraw while still engaged, believing that it had been both dangerous and unnecessary, while the lack of detailed planning, reconnaissance and orders were also seen as a factor in the disorganisation that ensued. While A Company had immediately withdrawn as ordered and had suffered a number of casualties in doing so, both B and D Companies, which were commanded by experienced veterans of the 2nd Australian Imperial Force, had delayed doing so until more favourable circumstances prevailed and fared better as a consequence. Yet the following morning a patrol from D Company cleared the abandoned A and B Company positions unopposed. The area was found littered with PVA dead and equipment. Among the casualties were both PVA and KPA, and it became clear that the Australians had been attacked by a mixed force, estimated at 1,500 men. Many of those killed were also found to have been carrying demolition charges.

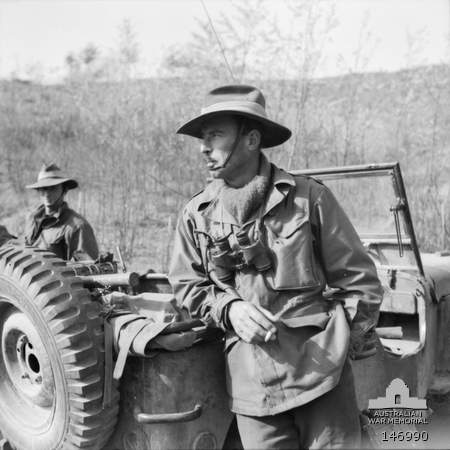
Ferguson shortly after taking command of 3 RAR, 7 November 1950

Despite the events of the previous night the Australians still held the road, while D Company continued to occupy the former PVA strongpoint on Hill 63, even if it was isolated from the rest of the battalion. Yet B and C Companies were now precariously positioned in the paddy field to the east and west of the road respectively, and come daylight were exposed to the PVA positions on the high ground. The same day Coad visited 3 RAR; dissatisfied with the battalion's dispositions and having now lost confidence in its commander, he relieved Walsh of his position, appointing the second-in-command, Major Bruce Ferguson, in his place. Walsh returned to his posting at US Eighth Army headquarters. Ferguson came forward to take command of the battalion. Ordering 3 RAR to dig-in, he despatched a number of clearing patrols, while C Company advanced unopposed to a hill overlooking the road 2.2 kilometres (1.4 mi) north-east of D Company. Reaching the top the Australians observed the PVA withdrawing northwards up the valley. Further east, the PVA attacked US 19 RCT; however, by the afternoon of 6 November it became apparent that the PVA withdrawal around Pakchon was part of a general disengagement.

== Aftermath ==
=== Casualties ===
After the 27th British Commonwealth Brigade's initial success, they had in turn been counter-attacked by the PVA before being pushed off the high ground during the night. During the action the brigade lost 12 killed and 70 wounded, the majority of them among the Australians. PVA losses were not known with many of their dead removed from the battlefield, but according to Commander Wu Xinquan of the PVA 39th Army, an infantry company from the PVA 350th Regiment of the 117th Division was badly mauled by the 27th British Commonwealth Brigade during the engagement. Australian forces later estimated that the PVA had suffered 200 killed and another 200 wounded. In their first battle with the PVA, 3 RAR had successfully captured a well defended hill with only limited offensive support, and had held it the face of heavy counter-attacks before confused command decisions resulted in the battalion conducting a disorganised night withdrawal while still in contact. The fighting was costly for both sides and although the Australians had halted the advancing PVA 117th Division and inflicted numerous casualties on them, they had also lost heavily. Nonetheless, the 27th British Commonwealth Brigade had succeeding in preventing a PVA break-through at Pakchon, keeping open vital withdrawal routes across the river and securing the UN left flank. Suffering significant casualties, the PVA offensive was finally halted the next day due to logistic difficulties. The Royal Australian Regiment and Argyll and Sutherland Highlanders were later granted the battle honour "Pakchon". The PVA and KPA were temporarily forced to withdraw north, while Walker successfully reinforced the UN positions, holding on the Chongchon Line. The PVA had failed to exploit their initial success, and instead now seemed to adopt a deliberately cautious strategy.

=== Subsequent operations ===
On 7 November, the US 24th Infantry Division and 27th British Commonwealth Brigade followed up the PVA withdrawal with a limited probing advance. That morning Australian clearing patrols killed seven PVA soldiers, before 3 RAR prepared to advance with the remainder of the brigade. C Company occupied Hill 74 2.5 kilometres (1.6 mi) to the north-east without opposition, only to discover a KPA company on the reverse slope. The Australians engaged the KPA with machine-gun fire, inflicting heavy losses on the defenders and capturing five before forcing them to withdraw towards Tang-dong harried by artillery and airstrikes. The remainder of the battalion deployed on the right, while the Argylls occupied two hills further north. The brigade's advance had forestalled a planned KPA attack on the night of 7/8 November, while large numbers of PVA dead from the previous fighting were also discovered. On 9 November the advance wheeled to the north-west around Pakchon, with 3 RAR moving forward another 3 kilometres (1.9 mi) to the east, encountering little resistance and taking a number of prisoners in the process. From 11 November the 27th British Commonwealth Brigade advanced slowly north. On 16 November 3 RAR occupied Hill 117, on a bend in the Taeryong River 3 kilometres (1.9 mi) north of Pakchon. Over the following weeks they remained in the Pakchon area, conducting extensive patrolling up to company-size, and clashing with small groups of PVA/KPA. As winter approached the weather became bitterly cold amid snow and strong winds. Unprepared for the extreme conditions the Australians increasingly suffered health problems, particularly among the older members of the battalion. Lacking the training and equipment for operations in ice and snow, maintenance also proved burdensome before additional US cold weather clothing and equipment was issued.

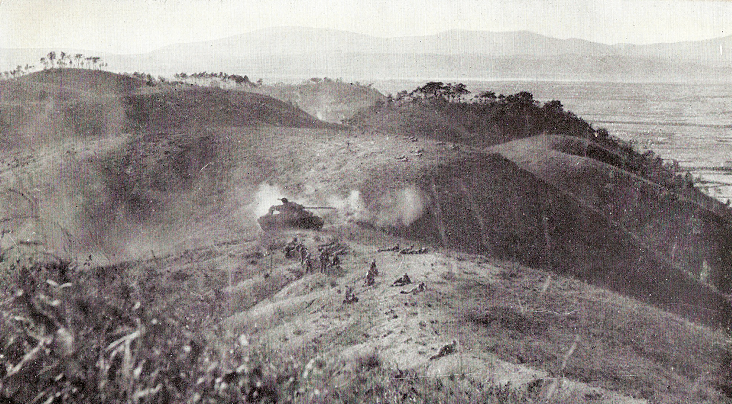
C Company, 3 RAR with American tanks during fighting for the Pakchon–Sinanju road, 7 November 1950

Ferguson ultimately proved to be an able commander. He remained with the battalion after that time. The change of command was confirmed by the Commander-in-Chief BCOF, Lieutenant General Sir Horace Robertson, and Ferguson was promoted to lieutenant colonel on 10 November. He developed a good working relationship with Coad, who held him in high regard, and went on to command 3 RAR during its most demanding period in Korea.

The UN resumed the offensive on 24 November, shortly before the PVA began their own Second Phase Offensive. The PVA 13th Army Group launched a series of surprise attacks on the night of 25 November, pushing the US Eighth Army back to the Chongchon River. The PVA inflicted heavy losses on the ROK and decimated the US 2nd Infantry Division on the right flank, as the US Eighth Army began a long retreat south. At the same time, the PVA 9th Army Group ambushed US X Corps near the Chosin Reservoir as the freezing winter weather set in. Although the US Eighth Army succeeded in avoiding encirclement, US X Corps had to be evacuated by sea from Hungnam during December 1950. MacArthur's forces were expelled from North Korea and withdrew to the 38th Parallel, where they sought to once again establish defensive positions. In reserve at the start of the renewed PVA offensive, the 27th British Commonwealth Brigade was spared the initial brunt. Yet the offensive soon forced the UN forces into a disorganised withdrawal. 3 RAR withdrew 320 kilometres (200 mi) in nine days, arriving at Uijeongbu, 24 kilometres (15 mi) north-east of Seoul, on 11 December 1950. There the British and Australians occupied defensive positions in an attempt to secure the northern approaches to the South Korean capital during the Battle of Uijeongbu.
