= Mediterranean 1901 (Battle honour) =

Battle honour of the British Army

Mediterranean 1901 was a battle honour awarded to the following Militia battalion of the British Army for service during the Second Boer War of 1899–1902, when it performed garrison duty in the Mediterranean, relieving regular Army troops for active service:

- 5th (Royal Limerick County Militia) Battalion, Royal Munster Fusiliers

Personnel were awarded the Queen's Mediterranean Medal.

This honour should not be confused with the award Mediterranean which was granted for service in the Crimean War.

This award was rescinded in 1910 when the Militia (now Special Reserve) battalions assumed the same honours as their parent regiments.
