= Hindoostan (Battle honour) =

Battle honor celebrating the conquest of British India

Hindoostan was a battle honour awarded to the following regiments of the British Army for their service during the conquest of British India between 1780 and 1823:

- 8th King's Royal Irish Hussars
- 17th (Leicestershire) Regiment of Foot, later the Royal Leicestershire Regiment
- 36th (Herefordshire) Regiment of Foot, later 2nd Battalion, Worcestershire Regiment
- 52nd (Oxfordshire) Regiment of Foot, later 2nd Battalion, Oxfordshire and Buckinghamshire Light Infantry
- 71st (Highland) Regiment of Foot, later 1st Battalion, Highland Light Infantry
- 72nd (Highland) Regiment of Foot, later 1st Battalion, Seaforth Highlanders
- 76th (Hindoostan) Regiment of Foot, later 2nd Battalion, The Duke of Wellington's Regiment (West Riding)
