= India (battle honour) =

India was a battle honour awarded to the following regiments of the British Army for their service during the conquest of British India between 1787 and 1826:

- 12th (East Suffolk) Regiment of Foot, later the Suffolk Regiment
- 14th (Buckinghamshire) Regiment of Foot, later the West Yorkshire Regiment
- 65th (2nd Yorkshire, North Riding) Regiment of Foot, later 1st Battalion, the York and Lancaster Regiment
- 67th (South Hampshire) Regiment of Foot, later 2nd Battalion, the Hampshire Regiment
- 69th (South Lincolnshire) Regiment of Foot, later 2nd Battalion, the Welch Regiment
- 75th (Stirlingshire) Regiment of Foot, later 1st Battalion, the Gordon Highlanders
- 84th (York and Lancaster) Regiment of Foot, later 2nd Battalion, the York and Lancaster Regiment
- 86th (Royal County Down) Regiment of Foot, later 2nd Battalion, the Royal Ulster Rifles
