= Norway 1941 (Battle honour) =

Norway 1941 was a battle honour awarded to units of the British and Imperial Armies that took part in one or more of the following operations in the Second World War:

- Operation Claymore
- Operation Gauntlet
- Operation Archery
