= St Helena (Battle honour) =

St Helena was a battle honour awarded to the following Militia battalions of the British Army for guarding Boer prisoners on the island of Saint Helena during the Second Boer War of 1899–1902:

- 4th Battalion, the Gloucestershire Regiment (Royal North Gloucestershire Regiment of Militia)
- 3rd Battalion, the Duke of Edinburgh's (Wiltshire Regiment) (Royal Wiltshire Regiment of Militia)
