= Jordan (Es Salt) =

Jordan (Es Salt) was a battle honour awarded to units of the British and Imperial Armies that took part in either of the following battles:

- The First Action of Es Salt, 24–25 March 1918
- The Second Action of Es Salt, 30 April – 4 May 1918
