= Magdhaba-Rafah (battle honour) =

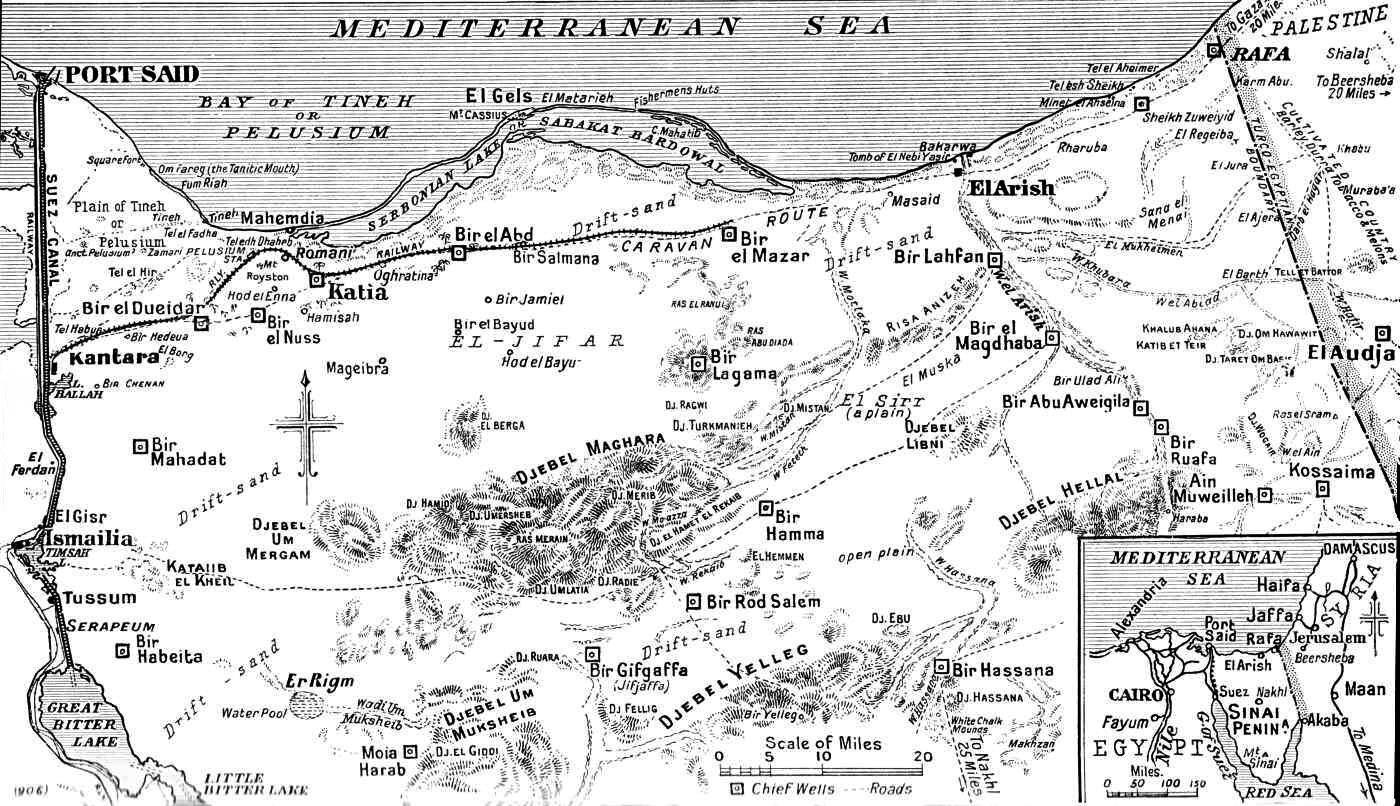
Map showing the location of Bir el Magdhaba and Rafah in the Sinai Peninsula.

Magdhaba-Rafah and Maghdaba-Rafah were battle honours awarded to units of the Australian Imperial Force and the New Zealand Expeditionary Force that took part in the Affair of Magdhaba or the Action of Rafah during the winter of 1916–17 in the Sinai Campaign of the Great War.

Australian units were awarded Magdhaba-Rafah:

- 1st Light Horse Regiment
- 2nd Light Horse Regiment
- 3rd Light Horse Regiment
- 8th Light Horse Regiment
- 9th Light Horse Regiment
- 10th Light Horse Regiment
- 14th Light Horse Regiment
- 15th Light Horse Regiment
- 26th (Tasmanian Mounted Infantry) Light Horse Regiment

New Zealand units were awarded Maghdaba-Rafah:

- 1st Mounted Rifles (Canterbury Yeomanry Cavalry)
- Queen Alexandra's 2nd (Wellington West Coast) Mounted Rifles
- 3rd (Auckland) Mounted Rifles
- 4th (Waikato) Mounted Rifles
- 6th (Manawatu) Mounted Rifles
- 9th (Wellington East Coast) Mounted Rifles
- 10th (Nelson) Mounted Rifles
- 11th (North Auckland) Mounted Rifles
