= Battle of Chuam-ni =

1951 battle of the Korean War

- Part of the Korean War
Date	14–17 February 1951
Location	Chuam-ni, South Korea
Result	UN victory

Belligerents
United Nations: United States; Australia; United Kingdom; Canada; South Korea; New Zealand	China

Commanders and leaders
Unknown	Unknown

Casualties and losses
(United States) 114 killed (United States) 98 wounded (Australia) 4 killed (Australia) 16 wounded	Unknown

The Battle of Chuam-ni was fought between 14–17 February 1951, at Chuam-ni, South Korea, as part of the Chinese People's Volunteer Army (PVA) Third Offensive towards Wonju during the Korean War. The battle was for control of the supply line Route 24.

== Background ==
Due to insufficient strength in troop numbers, a gap of about 12 miles (19 km) between the US 1st Battalion, 9th Infantry Regiment and the 23rd Regimental Combat Team. The PVA having become aware of the gap, prepared to exploit the gap in its offensive on Wongju. On 12 February 1st Battalion, 9th Infantry Regiment manning positions upon Hill 444 4 miles (6.4 km) east of Chip'yong-ni were attacked by two PVA battalions and was withdrawn to positions northwest of Wonju. During the morning of the 13 February, air observers noted PVA troop movements towards the gap toward the US 2nd Infantry Division's 2nd Reconnaissance Company east of Chuam-ni.

The 2nd Reconnaissance Company having been sent out to patrol Route 24 in the gap in the defensive line around Wongju, were reinforced with L Company, 9th Infantry Regiment at 12:00 on 13 February. Almost immediately they were attacked by PVA from the northeast, which was repulsed. The PVA then tried to encircle the two companies bringing about the withdrawal of the companies to a blocking position on Route 24 at Chuam-ni.

== Battle ==
On 14 February at 05:00, the PVA, consisting of a regiment of the 116th Division of the 39th Army, launched an attack against the 2nd Reconnaissance Company and L Company, 9th Infantry at Chuam-ni. Suffering large casualties, the two companies withdrew south along Route 24. Having been surrounded, the companies fought a fighting withdrawal suffering further casualties. The total casualties suffered by the 2nd Reconnaissance Company and L Company, 9th Infantry were 114 killed and 98 wounded. The result of the withdrawal was that the 23rd Regiment was cut off and the isolated Regiment would then fight the Battle of Chipyong-ni.

The 27th British Commonwealth Brigade, consisting of the 1st Battalion, Middlesex Regiment, the 1st Battalion, Argyll and Sutherland Highlanders, the 3rd Battalion, Royal Australian Regiment, the 2nd Battalion, Princess Patricia's Canadian Light Infantry, the 60th Indian Field Ambulance, and the 16th Field Regiment, Royal New Zealand Artillery, were ordered to open Route 24 to the 23rd Regimental Combat Team and cover the gap in the defenses. Meeting the remnants of the 2nd Reconnaissance Company and L Company, 9th Infantry 5 miles (8.0 km) south of Chuam-ni and while pushing north slowly through PVA blocking the route.

Moving slowly north along Route 24, the 27th British Commonwealth Brigade heading towards Chip'yong-ni, were initially held up by a battalion sized force on 15 February, however on 16 February, the PVA had withdrawn and Chuam-ni was occupied on 17 February.

== Aftermath ==
With the PVA and North Korean forces withdrawing, a UN offensive was undertaken, known as Operation Killer. It was found that 68 soldiers of L Company had been killed by the PVA while sleeping and were found still in their sleeping bags.
