= Passchendaele (battle honour) =

Passchendaele is a battle honour that was awarded to units of the British and Imperial armies that took part in one or more of the following engagements in the Great War:

- First Battle of Passchendaele, 12 October 1917
- Second Battle of Passchendaele, 26 October–10 November 1917

These should not be confused with the battle commonly known as the Battle of Passchendaele, which is officially known to the British Army as the Third Battle of Ypres.
