= Kemmel (battle honour) =

Kemmel was a battle honour awarded to units of the British and Imperial Armies that took part in one or more of the following engagements in the World War I.

- First Battle of the Kemmelberg, 17–19 Apr 1918
- Second Battle of the Kemmelberg, 25–26 Apr 1918
