= Battle of Sariwon =

1950 battle of the Korean War

Coordinates: 38°30′23″N 125°45′35″E

- Part of the Korean War
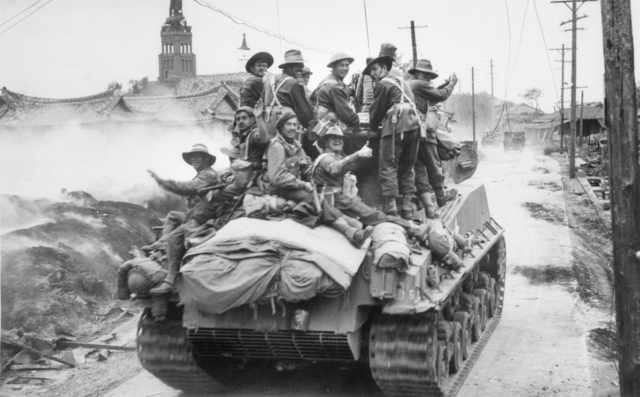
- Australian troops riding on a US Army Sherman tank at Sariwon in October 1950
Date	17 October 1950
Location	Sariwon, North Korea
Result	United Nations victory

Belligerents
United Nations: United Kingdom; Australia; United States	North Korea

Commanders and leaders
(United Kingdom) Basil Coad	(North Korea) Unknown

Units involved
27th Infantry Brigade: (Australia) 3 RAR; (United Kingdom) 1 ASHR; (United Kingdom) 1 MR; (United States) 7th Cavalry Regiment	(North Korea) unknown

Casualties and losses
1 killed 3 wounded	215 killed 3,700 captured

The Battle of Sariwon took place on 17 October 1950 during the United Nations (UN) counter-offensive against the North Korean forces which had invaded South Korea. With many Korean People's Army (KPA) units falling back under pressure from UN forces the 27th British Commonwealth Brigade under Brigadier Basil Coad—–comprising the 1st Battalion, the Argyll and Sutherland Highland Regiment, the 1st Battalion, the Middlesex Regiment and 3rd Battalion, the Royal Australian Regiment (3RAR) captured the town of Sariwon during a confused and largely one-sided action. Elements of the 7th US Cavalry Regiment were also involved. KPA casualties included 215 killed and more than 3,700 captured, whilst British-Commonwealth losses were one killed and three wounded (all of them from the Argylls).

== Background ==
On 15 October, US I Corps General Frank W. Milburn Milburn reflected Eighth Army commander General Walton Walker's impatience with what Walker thought was a slow advance. Milburn ordered the US 24th Infantry Division to move into attack position on the left (west) of the 1st Cavalry Division and to seize Sariwon from the south, and then attack north toward Pyongyang. On the same day, 1st Cavalry Division commander General Hobart R. Gay ordered the attached 27th British Commonwealth Brigade to assemble behind the 7th Cavalry Regiment and be prepared to pass through it and seize Sariwon. Thus, the stage was set for a continuation of the I Corps drive for Pyongyang. Gay has said of that period, "The situation was tense, everybody was tired and nervous."

== Battle ==
Colonel Stephen's 21st Infantry Regiment, 24th Division met just enough opposition as it moved from Paekch'on toward Haeju to prevent the infantry from mounting the trucks and rolling along rapidly as a motorized column. Its tank-infantry teams on 17 October overcame 300 KPA defending Haeju and secured the town that afternoon. The 19th Infantry Regiment, 24th Division, meanwhile, trailed the 5th Cavalry Regiment. Both of them turned westward off the main highway at Namch'onjom. The 19th Infantry was to continue westward beyond Nuch'on-ni and then turn north toward Sariwon. On the 16th, a bad traffic jam developed on the road up to Namch'onjom where the 27th British Commonwealth Brigade, the 5th Cavalry and the 19th Regiment were all on the road. For long periods the vehicles moved slowly, bumper to bumper. From Namch'onjom westward, the 19th Infantry, behind the 5th Cavalry Regiment, was powerless to accelerate its pace although 24th Division commander General John H. Church had ordered it to do so. Word came at this time that Milburn had told Generals Gay and Church that whichever division—the 1st Cavalry or the 24th Infantry reached Sariwon first would thereby win the right to lead the Corps' attack on into Pyongyang. The 24th Division was handicapped in this race for Sariwon, as it had a roundabout, longer route over inferior roads and poorer supply routes.

On 17 October, with the 1st Battalion in the lead, the 7th Cavalry Regiment followed the secondary "cow path" road north from Sohung in a circuitous route toward Hwangju where it would strike the main Pyongyang highway north of Sariwon. The 27th British Commonwealth Brigade passed through the lines of the 7th Cavalry that morning at Sohung and took up the advance along the main highway toward Sariwon. Sariwon lay some 30 miles (48 km) up the highway almost due west from Sohung. At Sariwon, the highway and railroad debouched from the mountains, turned north and ran through the coastal plain to Pyongyang, 35 miles (56 km) away. Only occasional low hills lay across the road between Sariwon and Pyongyang. It was generally expected that the KPA would make their stand for the defense of Pyongyang, short of the city itself, on the heights before Sariwon.

A platoon of Major David Wilson's A Company of the Argyll 1st Battalion, mounted on M4 Sherman tanks, formed the point as the Argylls led the attack. Brigadier general Frank A. Allen, Jr., Assistant Division Commander, 1st Cavalry Division, accompanied the Argylls. Groups of haggard and hungry KPA soldiers stood along the roadside waiting for a chance to surrender, and Russian-made trucks, their gas tanks empty, stood abandoned. 4 miles (6.4 km) short of Sariwon, on the hills guarding the approach to the town, it looked for a while as if the anticipated big battle had started. KPA rifle fire suddenly burst on the column from a hillside apple orchard, 200 yards (180 m) away. The column stopped and the men sought cover. Behind the lead tanks, Allen jumped from his jeep, stamped along the road, waved a map and shouted, "They're in that orchard, rake 'em, blast them out of there!" The general's aide, 1st Lieutenant John T. Hodes, climbed on one of the tanks and trained his glasses on the orchard to give fire direction. The pilot of a spotter plane above the ridge dipped his wings to indicate the presence of the KPA in force. A few North Koreans started running from the orchard when the tanks began firing into it. Suddenly, a mass of North Koreans broke from the orchard, rushed for the ridge line, and vanished over the top. Wilson's A Company of the Argylls moved on the orchard and swept it clean of remaining KPA troops. They killed about 40 and captured others in this brief action. The fleeing KPA left behind ten machine guns and, in the pass, they abandoned a battery of antitank guns. The British now entered Sariwon, a large town, which they found to be badly damaged by bombing. Their loss thus far for the day was one man killed and three wounded.

About 17:00 in the afternoon 3RAR passed through the Argylls in the town and advanced 5 miles (8.0 km) north of it toward Hwangju. There the Australians went into a perimeter blocking position in front of a range of hills strongly held by the KPA, and prepared to attack in the morning. Now began a succession of weird events in what proved to be a chaotic night in Sariwon. A British reconnaissance group south of the town encountered a truckload of KPA soldiers driving north. The North Koreans shot their way through and continued into the town, but, finding the northern exit closed, they turned back and met the reconnaissance group again. In this second encounter, the reconnaissance party killed about 20 of the KPA. A little later, Lieutenant colonel Leslie Nielson, commanding officer of the Argyll 1st Battalion, driving in the gloom near the southern end of Sariwon, was suddenly amazed to see coming toward him on either side of the road a double file of KPA soldiers. The leading soldiers fired at him but missed. Nielson shouted to his driver, "Put your foot on it!" The driver did, and raced 4 miles (6.4 km) through the marching North Koreans. Clearing the last of them, Nielson and his driver took to the hills and stayed there until morning. This KPA force, fleeing in front of the 19th Infantry, 24th Division, and approaching Sariwon from the south, did not know the town had already fallen to UN units. There were many times during the night when UN soldiers thought the North Koreans were South Koreans coming up from the south with the 24th Division, and the North Koreans thought the British were Russians. There were several instances of mutual congratulations and passing around of cigarettes. One group of North Koreans greeted a platoon of Argylls with shouts of "Comrade!" and, rushing forward in the dim light, slapped the Scots on the back, offered cigarettes, and gave them the red stars from their caps as souvenirs. The ensuing fight was at very close quarters. Lieutenant Robin D. Fairrey, the Argylls' mortar officer, walked around a corner into a group of North Koreans. Maintaining his composure, he said to them, "Rusky, Rusky," and after receiving several pats on the back, turned another corner and got away. During this scrambled night at Sariwon, about 150 KPA were killed; strangely enough, the British lost only one soldier. Most of the KPA passed through the town. North of it the Australian Battalion captured 1,982 KPA soldiers at its roadblock. Major I. B. Ferguson played a leading role in capturing this group. When the first of them came up to the Australian outpost, a night battle seemed imminent. Ferguson mounted a tank and called out in the gloom for the North Koreans to surrender, telling them they were surrounded. After some hesitation, the leading KPA unit dropped its arms and surrendered, and most of the others followed its example.

During the day, while the 27th British Commonwealth Brigade advanced on Sariwon along the main highway, the 7th Cavalry Regiment, with Colonel Clainos' 1st Battalion in the lead, hurried along the poor secondary roads through the hills north of it. This column was about 3 miles (4.8 km) from Hwangju and the main highway above Sariwon when at 16:00 it received a message Gay dropped from a light plane. The message said that the roads out of Sariwon were crowded with hundreds of KPA soldiers, and it directed Clainos to have one battalion of the 7th Cavalry turn south at Hwangju on the main highway to meet the British and help trap the large numbers of KPA in the Sariwon area, while another battalion turned right and held the town of Hwangju. Clainos and the two battalion commanders agreed that the 1st Battalion would turn to meet the British and the 2nd Battalion would hold Hwangju. Soon after turning south on the Sariwon-Pyongyang highway, the leading elements of the 1st Battalion captured a KPA cavalry detachment and 37 horses. A little later, the battalion came under fire from the KPA on the hill barrier ahead and separating it from the Australians. The battalion's motorized point had a short skirmish with a KPA group during which its South Korean interpreter, although wounded, tried and succeeded in reaching the KPA forward position. He told the North Koreans that the column they were fighting was Russian. The KPA platoon thereupon came up to the 7th Cavalry's point, which Clainos had just joined. Clainos turned the KPA group over to a squad leader who proceeded to disarm it. The KPA surrender took place in clear daylight and was observed by hundreds of KPA soldiers in the nearby hills. Almost immediately, KPA soldiers from the eastern side of the position began pouring in to surrender. On the western side, however, small arms fire continued until dark when many there also came out to surrender. Altogether, more than 1,700 KPA soldiers and thirteen female nurses surrendered to the 1st Battalion that evening. Clainos had established radio communication with the Australians about 18:00. At 22:30, he radioed Colonel Green of the Australian battalion that, with vehicle lights on, he was coming through the pass with his battalion and prisoners. At 23:00 the 1st Battalion, 7th Cavalry, reached the Australian perimeter.

== Aftermath ==
The 1st Cavalry Division subsequently led the assault of Pyongyang, capturing the city on 20 October simultaneously with the Republic of Korea Army 1st Infantry Division.

== Bibliography ==
- Bartlett, Norman, ed. (1960). With the Australians in Korea (Third ed.). Canberra, Australian Capital Territory: Australian War Memorial. OCLC 488462542.
- Farrar-Hockley, Anthony (1990). The British Part in the Korean War: A Distant Obligation. Vol. I. London, England: HMSO. ISBN 0-11-630953-9.
- O'Neill, Robert (1985). Australia in the Korean War 1950–53: Combat Operations. Vol. II. Canberra, Australian Capital Territory: Australian War Memorial. ISBN 978-0-642-04330-6.
- Pears, Maurie (2007). Battlefield Korea: The Korean Battle Honours of the Royal Australian Regiment, 1950–1953. Loftus, New South Wales: Australian Military History Publications. ISBN 9780980379600.
