= Michael Levy =

Michael Levy or Mike Levy could refer to:

- Michael George Levy (1925–2007), British-Canadian military officer
- Michael Levy, Baron Levy (born 1944), British music industry executive and life peer
- Michael R. Levy (born 1946), American magazine publisher
- Michael M. Levy (1950–2017), American professor of English and philosophy
- Mickey Levy (born 1951), Israeli politician
- Mike Lévy (born 1985), better known as Gesaffelstein, French DJ, songwriter, and record producer
- Mike Levy (businessman), American businessman

== See also ==
- Micky Levy, Israeli-American film director, screenwriter, and actress
- Michael Levey (1927–2008), English art historian
- Mike Levey (1948–2003), American infomercial host
