= Kapyong =

Kapyong may refer to:

- Gapyeong, South Korea
- Kapyong Barracks, a former Canadian Forces base in Winnipeg, Manitoba, Canada
- Battle of Kapyong, a battle of the Korean War
- Kapyong (film), a 2011 Australian documentary film about the Battle of Kapyong
