= Maehwasan =

- Maehwasan (Gangwon) in Wonju, Hoengseong, Gangwon-do.
  - Battle of Maehwa-San
- Maehwasan (South Gyeongsang) in Hapcheon, Gyeongsangnam-do.
