= Z (joke line) =

Dial-a-joke service

External videos
- Z excerpts with narration by Evan Doorbell on YouTube (part one)
- Z excerpts with narration by Evan Doorbell on YouTube (part two)
- Z excerpts with narration by Evan Doorbell on YouTube (part three)

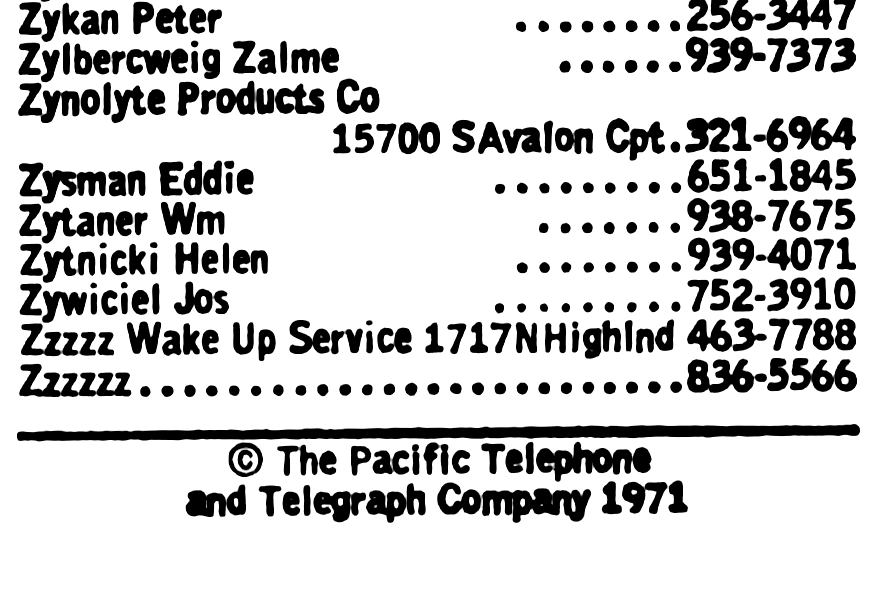
Zzzzzz as it appears in the June 1971 issue of the Los Angeles Central White Pages

Zzzzzz, later just Z, was a dial-a-joke service active in the 1970s and early 1980s. Started by Bob Bilkiss of West Los Angeles in 1970, it operated from the 213 area code and was named so to appear last in the Los Angeles telephone directory. Emerging from a wave of dial-a-joke numbers in Los Angeles in the turn of the 1970s, Zzzzzz enjoyed a high level of popularity in its day. For several years, it was the busiest residential telephone number in the United States, if not the world.

== History ==
=== Conception and development ===
Zzzzzz was launched by Bob Bilkiss (d. 1989) of West Los Angeles, who originally operated the service from his residential phone line, in February 1970. Bilkiss, then a student of Santa Monica College, said that Zzzzzz grew out of a whimsical desire to have the first and last entries in the Los Angeles telephone directory. He was able to obtain the first listing because the phone books of Pacific Telephone used the street name as a second sort key when two entries had the same name. There was already an entry with the name "A"; Bilkiss's appeared above it because his street name started with a B. To obtain the last listing in the book, however, Pacific Telephone required Bilkiss to prepare a notarized statement that "Zzzzzz" was his official nickname. He got a friend to bear witness that his "nickname" was due to his propensity for falling asleep in class.

The February 1970 issue of the Pacific Telephone telephone directory was the first time Zzzzzz's number, 837-5566 (later 836-5566), was published. Bilkiss's phone line—by this point not set up as a dial-a-joke service—rang nonstop on the first day of February as a consequence, much to the chagrin of his parents, who had to set up another phone line in the household because of the sheer volume of calls. Bilkiss recruited his friend Dave Friedman, an engineering student at UCLA, to devise an answering machine for the line, along with a counter that would advance every time the answering machine would take a call.

Tired of getting the busy signal every time you call Z? Want to do something about it? Well, we have an idea for you. Try misdialing to a wrong number.

— Z

The first recordings on the answering machine was a teaser reel comprising humorous impersonations of people curious to the purpose of Zzzzzz's entries in the phone book, as a way to build further interest for the launch of Zzzzzz as a dial-a-joke service. The line was updated weekly, and the number of calls per week were logged. The line initially attracted hundreds of callers per day. By 1972, this had grown to 1,500 per day; it reached 100,000 calls in December 1970. Callers frequently encountered busy signals when trying to reach the line due to the volume of traffic—a fact that was spoofed by the line in one skit.

Bilkiss and Friedman rented an apartment on Los Palmas Avenue from which to run the service. By 1971 the service had grown to a staff of five, including writer Jeff Robbins, announcer and tape editor John Shannon and cartoonist Jerry Leibowitz. (Note: Robbins and Leibowitz joined Zzzzzz in March 1970 and June 1970, respectively; Shannon joined shortly after June 1970.) Starting in June 1970, Zzzzzz began advertising hour-long "live" shows, wherein callers could talk to Bilkiss and company, twice a week. (Note: One such show occurred on May Day 1971, at 7 p.m. PT.) It was through these shows that the crew discovered the young Shannon in 1970, who had considerable experience in production work. Shannon became Zzzzzz's announcer and was responsible for the line's format refresh in September 1970.

=== Content and technical details ===
Though Pacific Telephone was rumored to have split the profits they made from calls to the line with the Zzzzzz staff, Zzzzzz was an entirely non-profit affair, with Bilkiss paying for the monthly telephone bill (about $5.85 in 1979). In 1971, Bilkiss explained that he and his colleagues represented "a sort of melting pot ... a cross-section of interests ... a combination of long-hairs and short-hairs. We are all in college except for Jeff and we're all 21 except for John, who is 19". He and Friedman initially spent two to three days a week recording jokes, which at the onset were spoofs of contemporary radio and television advertisements and programs. They later gained access to a small professional recording studio by way of a friend in broadcasting. Friends and acquaintances volunteered their voice talents, while Bilkiss and Friedman acquired a stack of royalty-free production music and produced their own sound effects for use in skits. To prevent the recordings from wearing out due to the heavy traffic the line received, the answering machine was built to be rugged and outfitted with high-quality, high-fidelity tape stock.

Bilkiss defined the skits in Zzzzzz as middle-of-the-road and apolitical, explaining that "We like humor that doesn't point a finger at anyone or insult anyone". In addition he explained that he and his staff were drug-free, stating, "Somehow we never find neither time nor desire for it. We have enough going on with Z to turn us on". Bilkiss and Friedman occasionally hijacked the line from the answering machine to talk to their callers directly. From doing this they found that their audience comprised a varied audience: children, switchboard operators, businesspeople calling from expensive long-distance lines and phone phreaks. The nationalities of their callers also ran the gamut, with Bilkiss in 1973 saying that they received calls from Europe, New Zealand, Japan and Vietnam.

=== Final years ===
The number of reels of tape the Zzzzzz staff recorded had grown to several hundred by 1979. New weekly recording mostly ceased by 1974; afterwards Bilkiss and Friedman only recorded when the inspiration struck. After Bilkiss graduated from Santa Monica College and UCLA, he worked at Magtec, a manufacturer of audiotape, before moving to AT&T to work as a national sales manager for their Recording subsidiary in 1975. He and Friedman later worked full-time as telephone systems designers and consultants in the late 1970s, still running Zzzzzz as a hobby on the side. The line was still operational in 1982.

== Archives ==
Select excerpts from Zzzzzz have been digitized and uploaded to DialAJoke.us, an online repository run by Ronald Gibson dedicated to dial-a-joke lines of Zzzzzz's day. More recordings are available online from phone phreak Evan Doorbell.
