= Michael George Levy =

British-Canadian military officer

Michael George Levy (1925 – 4 June 2007) was a British and Canadian military officer.

Levy was born in Bombay (now Mumbai, India) as the oldest of four siblings and raised in Shanghai, where he attended the Shanghai Public School for Boys. During the Second World War he was arrested by the Japanese and sent first to Pootung Internment Camp, and subsequently transferred to the Lunghua Civil Assembly Centre. He escaped from Lunghua with four other internees who made their way on foot and by junk to India.

Once in India, he was recruited by the Special Operations Executive of the British Army, which offered him training in guerrilla warfare and espionage. They made him second in command of a Force 136 patrol liaison team with the wartime rank of captain. The team was dropped in the jungles of Malaya in July 1945. After the Japanese surrender in August 1945 they were "engaged in diffusing hostilities between the Malayan Peoples' Anti-Japanese Army (MPAJA) and collaborators as well as maintaining control of the Japanese and warding off bandits". He was mentioned in despatches for bravery. Levy served as an investigator with the War Crimes Tribunal, in which capacity he supervised the repatriation of remains from Shanghai's Hung Jao Road Cemetery to British Hong Kong.

In 1948 Levy resigned from the British Army and moved to Vancouver, joining The Irish Fusiliers of Canada (The Vancouver Regiment). He served in the Korean War as a lieutenant with the Second Battalion, Princess Patricia's Canadian Light Infantry (PPCLI). During the Battle of Kapyong, he ordered an artillery bombardment on his own company's position. This prevented his company from being overrun by a Chinese attack with far superior forces.

His subsequent postings included Germany, Vietnam, and Cyprus, where he was deputy commander of the Canadian peacekeepers. From 1968-69 he attended and graduated from the United States Marine Corps Command And Staff College in Quantico, Virginia. He then served with the Canadian Defence Liaison Staff in Washington, DC, and with the Military Intelligence Directorate at National Defence Headquarters in Ottawa. He retired in 1974 at the rank of major.

He and his wife Marjorie, whom he married in 1951, had four children. His escape from the Japanese internment camp was featured in the 1992 documentary Across the Jade Divide. His military decorations included the Defence Medal, War Medal with Oak Leaf, Burma Star, Korea Medal, Volunteer Service Medal, NATO Medal, Canadian Peacekeeping Medal, United Nations Korea Medal, Canadian Forces' Decoration, and the United States Presidential Unit Citation. He was posthumously awarded an Apostle of Peace Medal by the Democratic Republic of Korea in 2017.

Unlike many of his compatriots, Levy did not receive a Military Cross for his actions at Kapyong. Author Hub Gray later discovered an incident recorded by communications officer Mel Canfield regarding Levy. Canfield wrote that Colonel James Riley Stone had remarked that he would "not award a medal to a Jew"; this antisemitic prejudice (although Levy did not identify as Jewish) resulted in the award instead going to Captain Wally Mills, who had relayed Levy's coordinates during the battle. Stone's comment was shared widely among the PPCLI at the time, causing issues with morale. As a result of Gray's advocacy, in 2004 Levy received a grant of arms; the motto on his coat of arms was "I have prevailed".
