= Military victories against the odds =

Overview of unlikely military victories

Throughout history, in various wars and conflicts, there have been a number of historic victories won by a smaller force, against a larger foe. Conditions and situations for these sorts of military victories against the odds have been numerous. Some victories have been pivotal to the conflict they were part of, or provided inspiration for the other forces. In many cases, because of the heroic and remarkable nature of the victories, the events have become famous in that culture. In many cases, they have lifted morale of the forces, and been remembered many years, if not hundreds of years later, by that culture or historians.

== Situational conditions ==
Sometimes military victories against the odds are achieved because the larger force is caught unexpectedly, where the smaller force has surprised the larger force giving it an advantage. In some cases, Cormac O'Brien noted in Outnumbered and Outgunned, that complacency is a factor since the larger force is unprepared for a serious battle/threat because of its distinct size advantage. That was the case at Battle of Okehazama in which the larger force was so confident that it had started drinking in the encampment, and the smaller force attacked.

In some cases, either by luck or good management, the smaller force killed the leader, and the larger force broke following the breakdown of the chain of command. That was the case at the Battle of Galveston and the Battle of Okehazama in which both leaders were killed, and the remaining forces, while still larger, stopped fighting.

In some cases, the smaller force was simply better trained or had better morale. That was the case at the Battle of Lacolle Mills (1814) in which the British regulars, well trained and with good morale, charged less well-trained American troops and forced them to flee, despite being outnumbered 12 to 1, and was a noted feature of the Battle of Kapyong, where two Chinese divisions, a force of 20,000 soldiers, were successfully resisted by a battalion of 700 Canadians defending a hill defence and supported by long-range artillery barrages. O'Brien also notes that in some circumstances victory for the smaller side came down to the smaller force having better leadership, over a poorly managed larger force for instance, the French having divided leadership at the Battle of Agincourt.

In some cases, subterfuge was used. During World War II, a group of five Germans, under the command of Fritz Klingenberg, fought garrison troops and captured the entire city of Belgrade and its thousands of troops by pretending to be an entire army.

Certain battles also involved the use of defences or topographical features to get an advantage. At Agincourt, the English benefited from a position where their flanks and rear were protected by woods, and the ground in front of them was muddy from rain. That drove the oncoming french horse onto prepared wooden stake defences, and meant the French could not use their advantage of numbers

== Notable military victories against the odds ==
=== Classical Antiquity ===
==== Boudican revolt ====
The Boudican revolt was an assault by 230,000 Celtic Britons, although the source for this number is the Roman Scholar and Historian Lucius Cassius Dio writing around 100 years after the battle took place. The Boudican rebels more likely numbered between 20,000–40,000. Led by Queen Boudica of the Iceni tribe, against a Roman army of 10,000 under the command of Gaius Suetonius Paulinus. When reinforcements failed to arrive, the Roman governor moved his forces into a bottlenecked valley, forcing the uncoordinated Celts to come to him. His forces first exhausted their ranged weaponry before moving forward in a tight, shielded formation, while cavalry forces harassed the sides of the enemy formation. The Romans fought in formation with the stabbing gladius as they were trained to fight, whereas the Celts were shoehorned with very little space to use their swords in a swinging motion as they were accustomed to. Worsening the situation, the Celts had left their wagons blocking their route of escape, preventing routed forces from effectively fleeing. In total, around 80,000 Celts were ultimately killed, while the Roman army suffered only around 400 losses, with similar numbers injured, and the rebellion was firmly crushed.

=== Medieval era ===
==== Battle of Dupplin Moor ====
The Battle of Dupplin Moor was fought between supporters of King David II of Scotland, son of King Robert the Bruce, and English-backed invaders supporting Edward Balliol, son of King John I of Scotland, on 11 August 1332, during the second war of Scottish independence. It took place a little to the south-west of Perth, Scotland, when a Scottish force commanded by Donald, Earl of Mar and Robert Bruce, Lord of Liddesdale, estimated to have been made up of more than 15,000 and possibly as many as 40,000 men, attacked a largely English force of 1,500 commanded by Balliol and Henry Beaumont, Earl of Buchan. This was the first major battle of the Second War of Scottish Independence.

Balliol's army crossed the River Earn at night via an unguarded ford and took up a strong defensive position. In the morning, the Scots raced to attack the English, disorganising their own formations. Unable to break the line of English men-at-arms, the Scots became trapped in a valley with fresh forces arriving from the rear pressing them forward and giving them no room to manoeuvre, or even to use their weapons. English longbowmen shot into both Scottish flanks. Many Scots died of suffocation or were trampled underfoot. Eventually they broke and the English men-at-arms mounted and pursued the fugitives until nightfall. Perth fell, the remaining Scottish forces dispersed and Balliol was crowned King of Scots.

Precise figures for the English dead are available: they lost 35 men-at-arms: 2 knights and 33 squires. Several accounts stress that not a single English archer was killed. The losses among the Scots are less certain, but all accounts agree they were very heavy. Mar and Liddesdale died on the field; as did 2 other earls, 14 barons, 160 knights and many less notable men. Of the contemporary accounts which estimate the number of Scottish dead, two English chronicles give more than 15,000. Two Scottish accounts record 2,000 or 3,000 dead, while a third specifies 3,000 "nobles" and "of other men an untold number". Most accounts refer to the Scottish dead lying in great heaps, some taller than a spear's length.

==== Battle of Agincourt ====
Another battle often noted for being a victory against the odds was the Battle of Agincourt (1415) in the Hundred Years' war, which saw a depleted English army, led by Henry V and comprising 5,000 to 8,000 longbowmen, achieve victory over a superior French army of 15,000 to 30,000 cavalry and heavy infantry; the English were outnumbered, possibly by as much as five-to-one. The English achieved this unexpected victory through a combination of better tactics, favorable terrain, and the missile superiority of the longbow. Henry personally led his troops into battle and participated in hand-to-hand combat. The English adopted a defensive stance, erecting wooden fortifications and raining down arrows on the advancing French army.

When the English archers ran out of arrows, they dropped their bows and, using hatchets, swords, and the mallets they had used to drive their wooden stakes in, counterattacked the now shaken, fatigued, and wounded French men-at-arms massed in front of them. The French forces had sustained heavy losses, and were bogged down in the mud and encumbered in their heavy plate armor. The counter-attack from the English was a decisive blow, and the rest of the French army, having witnessed the slaughter, fled the field of battle. Henry V's victory at Agincourt, against a numerically superior French army, crippled France and started a new period in the war during which Henry married the French princess Catherine of Valois; their son, the future Henry VI, was made heir to the throne of France as well as of England.

=== Early modern period ===
==== Siege of Eger (1552) ====
During the rise of the Ottoman Empire in 1552, the Ottomans extended their territory even further into Central Europe, including the Kingdom of Hungary. They had already conquered most of the Kingdom of Hungary, including its capital, Buda, and attempted to conquer the castle protecting the major North-Hungarian city of Eger. The unmaintained castle lacked defenses and held a mere 2,100–2,300 defenders, some of whom were untrained, women or peasants who had fled from attacks elsewhere in the Kingdom of Hungary. On the other hand, the Ottomans attacked with an army of 35,000–40,000 well-equipped men (although old data mentions 150,000–200,000 men) and several hundred artillery, outnumbering the Hungarians approximately 17 to 1. However, the Hungarians withstood the siege and repelled the assaults until the Ottomans retreated (within 39 days), due to heavy casualties, leaving the Hungarians victorious, with approximately only 500 deaths.

==== Battle of Hodów ====
In June 1694 during the Polish-Ottoman war (1683–1699), 40,000 up to even 70,000 Tatars were dispatched from the Ottoman state of Crimean Khanate, with the intention of raiding the undefended countryside of the Kingdom of Poland. In response to the attack, 100 winged Polish hussars and 300 Towarzysz pancerny were sent to prevent the pillaging of the countryside. The mere total of 400 defenders were immensely outnumbered by the horde of 40,000 Ottomans (1 to 100), debatably the most uneven battle in history. The Polish fortified themselves with the remains of fences and tables abandoned by previous Ottoman assaults. They repelled the attacks for 6 hours; even when they ran out of ammunition for their firearms they replaced it with Tatar arrowheads. Due to the excellent defense of the Polish and the increasing casualties and losses of the Tatars (almost 2000 dead), they sent Lipkas (Polish-speaking Tatars) to negotiate surrender. However, the defenders declined, resulting in the end of the 6-hour battle and the retreat of the Tatars.

=== 19th century ===
==== Battle of Lacolle Mills (1814) ====
The battle of Lacolle Mills (aka the second battle of Lacolle Mills), occurring on 30 March 1814 during the War of 1812, saw just 180 British 13th Regiment of Foot (later reinforced), in combat with a much larger force of 4000 US troops (who were also armed with artillery). Being bombarded by artillery from the US forces, the leader of the British forces, Richard Handcock initially only had 180 British regulars entrenched in the Lacolle Mill against the overwhelming force. The stout stone blockhouse resisted most of the US artillery. Desperate, and running low on ammunition, Handcock's 80 men fixed bayonets and charged the US artillery, but was pushed back because of the overwhelming numbers. The Americans made a number of attempts on the British positions, but to no avail. A Grenadier company and a light company force of 160 men in the area forced marched to assist the British, arriving just after the initial assaults began. After this, a small number of Canadian troops later arrived to assist the British. With the new men, Handcock again fixed bayonets and charged the artillery position, this time overwhelming them. The US troops, 4000 strong, fled the battlefield against the British/Canadian forces who in the end, only numbered some 500 in total. Major General James Wilkinson, the US commander, was subsequently relieved of command. The battle was a major triumph for the British troops. Major General Wilkinson resigned from the Army after the defeat The US forces suffered 13 killed, 51–128 wounded and 13 missing, while the British suffered 11 killed, 46 wounded and 4 missing.

==== Battle of Brownstown ====
In the War of 1812, 25 Native Americans, led by Tecumseh, attacked 200 US troops. The US troops approached a forest and were fired at from the Indians hidden in it, at which point some of the US infantry fled. The leader of the US troops, Major Thomas Van Horne then ordered a withdrawal, at which point the whole US unit broke and fled in disorder. The Indians achieved the military victory against the odds, even though they were outnumbered 8 to 1. The Americans lost 17 people, while the Native Americans lost just 1.

==== Battle of Blood River ====
The Battle of Blood River of 16 December 1838 was a victory of 464 Voortrekkers led by Andries Pretorius over a Zulu force of 25,000 to 30,000, fought on the bank of the Ncome River, in what is today KwaZulu-Natal, South Africa. The Zulu had perhaps 3,000 casualties, while only three Voortrekker commando members were lightly wounded.

==== Battle of Gate Pa ====
The Battle of Gate Pā, on 29 April 1864, saw a British force of 1,700 men under Duncan Cameron attacking 200 defending Māori warriors in New Zealand. The Māori, through subterfuge and successful ambush techniques, repulsed an attack by Cameron's troops, who suffered 31 killed and 80 wounded. The Māori were withdrew from the area suffering between 25 and 30 casualties.

==== Battle of Rorke's Drift ====
This, possibly one of the most famous unlikely victories saw just over 150 British and colonial troops successfully defend a farmhouse against an intense assault by 3,000 to 4,000 Zulu warriors in 1879. The massive but piecemeal Zulu attacks on Rorke's Drift came very close to defeating the much smaller garrison. After repeated attacks, the Zulu force was depleted and no reinforcements were sent for further assaults on the position. Eleven Victoria Crosses were awarded to the combatants, it was the largest number of Victoria cross medals awarded by the British Government at any one battle. Despite being heavily outnumbered, the British lost only 17 dead to 351 Zulus. The event has become widely known as a battle where an underdog won against overwhelming odds

=== 20th century ===
==== Capture of Belgrade by Fritz Klingenberg ====
During World War II, Fritz Klingenberg, leading a reconnaissance patrol into Belgrade, sneaked into the city through enemy lines with just 6 men. The Yugoslav Army had thousands of men stationed in the capital, having retreated to the city from the countryside in order to make a defense against the invading German army. After a number of firefights with Yugoslav troops, Klingenberg made his way to the centre of the city. Using captured trucks, and parading captured Yugoslav troops, he presented himself to the Mayor, pretending to be a larger force. He also threatened the use of calling in the Luftwaffe and artillery strikes (though he in fact had no radio or ability to do so). Belgrade had been bombed a few days earlier, and 2200 people had been killed. Wary of this, the Mayor surrendered to his forces, at which point Klingenberg gathered a number of German flags from the embassy and ran them up various flagpoles in the city. The Yugoslav troops gave up, believing that there had been a general surrender. Shortly, another smaller force of 15 Germans came into the city and started also pretending to be a larger group, by driving captured vehicles repeatedly around the city so as to appear to be greater in number. Sometime later, the actual German Army arrived at the outskirts of the city, expecting to have to fight their way into the city (which had a substantial troop presence), they for a while refused to believe the city had been captured by Klingenberg. Belgrade was then fully occupied by the German Army later the same month and Belgrade became the seat of the puppet Nedić regime, headed by General Milan Nedić. Klingenberg was awarded the Knight's Cross of the Iron Cross for the capture of the city.

==== Battle of Kapyong ====
The battle occurred during the Korean War and the Chinese Spring Offensive of April 1951. The Chinese forces outnumbered the UN battalions by a factor of five to one, or by a factor of greater than ten to one. Two battalions of the 27th British Commonwealth Brigade, each of them consisting of about 700 soldiers, the Australian 3 RAR and the Canadian 2 PPCLI, supported by the artillery of the New Zealand 16th Field Regiment and 15 American Sherman tanks, withstood the assault of the full Chinese 118th Division and 60th Division, numbering about 20,000 men, in continuous fighting from 23 April to 27 April. The action was of crucial strategic significance as the Kapyong Valley was the traditional invasion route to Seoul, and potentially would enable the encirclement of US forces in Korea which were then in general retreat across the Korean front lines. The Australian 3 RAR resisted the Chinese attacks on Hill 504 during 23/24 April until threatened with being surrounded, and then retreated off the battlefield, together with the American tanks. These UN units were no longer engaged in the battle.

The Chinese then assaulted the Canadian 2 PPCLI defending Hill 677 in a last stand, who were outnumbered in the combat engagement area by at least ten to one, and in the battlefield zone by about 30 to 1. With his battalion encircled, abandoned by supporting units, and without possibility of resupply of ammunition, Lt. Col. Stone issued the order "No retreat, no surrender", and resisted mass attacks of Chinese infantry throughout the night of 24/25 April. The Canadians called in artillery fire from a New Zealand unit situated about 4.5 miles distant, directly onto some of their own positions on three occasions when overrun. After fierce fire-fights and intense artillery barrages, the Chinese withdrew on 25 April with enormous casualties of about 5,000 dead and many more wounded, mostly from artillery fire. The Canadians were exhausted of ammunition and supplies, but fortunately for the 2 PPCLI the Chinese failed to launch a final assault. The Canadian casualties were 18 killed and 38 wounded.

==== Battle of Longewala ====
Part of the Indo-Pakistani War of 1971, this battle saw 2000 to 3000 Pakistani soldiers and 40 tanks attack 120 Indian troops, with a detachment of 4 warplanes that gave them air superiority. The Indian troops used subterfuge, stringing barbwire and putting up minefield markers, in areas where there were in fact no mines. The Pakistani units were forced through inferior terrain and funneled into kill zones where the numerical advantage did not help them. The Pakistani advance stalled, not able to advance, and then eventually retreated once more Indian troops arrived. The Pakistani forces lost 200 troops in total, compared to Indian losses of just two men, and 5 camels. James Hatter, writing in the British media at the time, compared it to the Battle of Thermopylae.

==== Operation Eland ====
Part of the Rhodesian Bush War, 84 scouts with 4 armoured cars were able to successfully disguise and infiltrate, then destroy a ZANU guerilla compound without casualties as a response to an attack on a Rhodesian military base by ZANLA.

=== 21st century ===
==== Battle of Tarinkot ====
Part of the United States invasion of Afghanistan, 11 U.S. Special Forces soldiers and a few dozen Afghan fighters faced a Taliban force numbering in the hundreds. Despite being vastly outnumbered, the force used coordinated U.S. airpower to destroy the advancing Taliban column and force the survivors to withdraw to Kandahar, resulting in what the U.S. Army described as a "decisive military success" and an "overwhelming psychological and political victory."

==== Battle of Debecka Pass ====
Part of the 2003 invasion of Iraq, 26 U.S. Special Forces operators and roughly 150 Kurdish Peshmerga fighters at Debecka Pass successfully repelled a determined Iraqi armored counterattack, destroying tanks and armored vehicles with Javelin missiles and holding their position despite being heavily outnumbered and temporarily without air support.

==== First Battle of Fallujah ====
Part of the Iraq war, roughly 1,500 Iraqi insurgents in Fallujah successfully resisted an assault by over 2,000 U.S. Marines and coalition forces, inflicting significant casualties and forcing a withdrawal after weeks of fierce urban fighting despite being vastly outgunned and outmatched.

==== Battle of Husaybah ====
Part of the Iraq war, 127 U.S. Marines initially faced an assault by an estimated 600 insurgents in fierce urban fighting, ultimately repelling the attack and inflicting heavy casualties.

==== First Battle of Bint Jbeil ====
Part of the 2006 Lebanon war, approximately 100–140 Hezbollah fighters defended the fortified town against around 5,000 Israeli troops from four IDF brigades. Despite being vastly outnumbered and facing overwhelming Israeli superiority in armor, artillery and airpower, Hezbollah fighters repeatedly ambushed and repelled Israeli forces, inflicting significant casualties and preventing the IDF from capturing the town. After several days of fighting, the IDF withdrew from Bint Jbeil without achieving its objective, leaving the town in Hezbollah's hands until the end of the war.

==== Ramadan offensive (2006) ====
Part of the Iraq war, roughly 1,500 Iraqi insurgents launched a month-long offensive against more than 19,000 U.S., Iraqi, British, Danish and Salvadoran troops, escalating attacks across major cities, forcing coalition and Iraqi forces from numerous towns and cities and seizing large parts of Baghdad, Al Anbar province and Babil province despite being vastly outnumbered and outgunned.

==== Battle of Wanat ====
Part of the war in Afghanistan, 49 American soldiers at an isolated and poorly positioned outpost, alongside 24 Afghan troops, successfully repelled a massive assault by roughly 200 Taliban insurgents, forcing the attackers to withdraw despite being surrounded and heavily outnumbered; a U.S. Army study described the battle as a “victory despite desperate odds.”

==== Battle of Kamdesh ====
Part of the war in Afghanistan, 53 American soldiers at an isolated, poorly positioned outpost successfully repelled a massive siege by over 300 Taliban insurgents, inflicting heavy casualties and forcing a retreat despite being completely surrounded and outgunned from the high ground.

==== Battle of Misrata (2011) ====
Part of the first Libyan Civil War, roughly 5,000 Libyan opposition fighters held the besieged city of Misrata against a force of around 7,000 Gaddafi loyalist troops, surviving weeks of artillery, rocket and tank attacks before breaking the siege and forcing the Gaddafi forces to retreat.

==== Fall of Mosul ====
Part of the war in Iraq, this battle saw approximately 1,000 Islamic State fighters attack and overwhelm a nominal Iraqi security force of around 30,000 personnel defending Mosul. Despite being vastly outnumbered, the Islamic State exploited the weakness and disintegration of the Iraqi security forces, using coordinated attacks, suicide car bombs, and intimidation to collapse defensive positions across the city. Iraqi troops and police units, many of whom greatly outnumbered the attackers, abandoned their positions, shed their uniforms, and fled, leaving behind large quantities of weapons and equipment. Within days, the Islamic State had seized control of Mosul, Iraq's second-largest city, in one of the most major reversals of the Iraq War. Dennis Ross of the Hoover Institution described the battle as demonstrating the Islamic State's “apparent ability to win against all odds,” highlighting the extraordinary disparity between the approximately 1,000 attackers and the nominal 30,000-strong Iraqi force.

==== Siege of Kobanî ====
Part of the Syrian civil war, the Siege of Kobanî saw vastly outnumbered Kurdish forces withstand a nine-month Islamic State assault and ultimately defeat the jihadist proto-state.

==== Fall of Kabul ====
Part of the war in Afghanistan, the fall of Kabul on 15 August 2021 saw roughly 75,000 Taliban fighters defeat an Afghan security force nominally numbering around 300,000 personnel, after a rapid nationwide offensive, ending the war in Afghanistan.

==== Battle of Voznesensk ====
In the 2022 Russian invasion of Ukraine, approximately 130 Ukrainian defenders in Voznesensk defeated a column of 500 Russian troops, forcing a chaotic retreat and destroying or abandoning 30 armored vehicles while sustaining minimal casualties. The Ukrainian forces achieved a significant victory against the odds, despite being outnumbered nearly 4 to 1 and lacking armored vehicles, by using artillery and anti-tank missiles to destroy a critical bridge and trap the Russian advance.

== See also ==
- Military science
- Military tactics
- List of military disasters
- Pyrrhic victory
- Last stand
