= 28th Commonwealth Infantry Brigade =

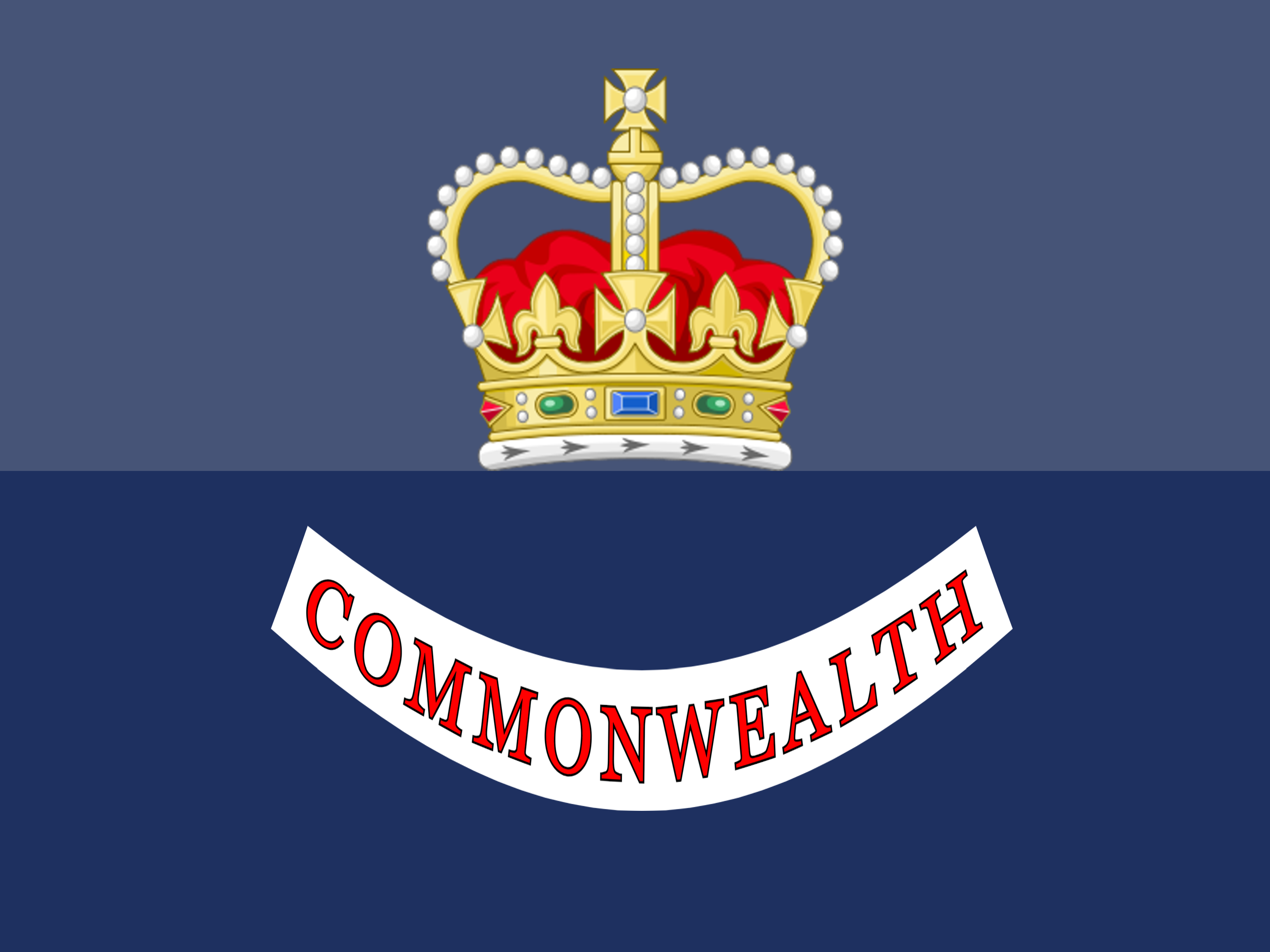
- Flag of the 28th Commonwealth Infantry Brigade
- Active: 1951–1954
- Country: United Kingdom; Australia; New Zealand
- Branch: British Army; Australian Army; New Zealand Army
- Type: Infantry
- Role: Infantry Brigade of the 1st Commonwealth Division
- Size: Brigade

The 28th Commonwealth Infantry Brigade was a Commonwealth formation of the 1st Commonwealth Division that served in Korea from 1952 to 1954.

== History ==
The brigade was constituted from the UK 28th Infantry Brigade, which had arrived in Hong Kong from the United Kingdom in 1949, to join the 40th Infantry Division. Formed in Korea in April 1951, it took the title '28th Commonwealth Brigade' replacing 27th Commonwealth Brigade in the 1st Commonwealth Division, and served right through the war, until leaving in 1954. It comprised two British and two Australian infantry battalions and 16th Field Regiment, Royal New Zealand Artillery.

== Commanders ==
Command of the brigade was shared by Australia and the United Kingdom.

| Commander | Country | Dates |
|---|---|---|
| Brigadier G. Taylor, CBE, DSO | United Kingdom | April 1951 to October 1951 |
| Lieutenant Colonel (Acting Brigadier) J.F.M MacDonald, DSO, OBE | United Kingdom | October 1951 to June 1952 |
| Brigadier T.J Daly, DSO, OBE | Australia | June 1952 to March 1953 |
| Brigadier J.G.N Wilton, DSO, OBE | Australia | March 1953 to February 1954 |
| Brigadier I.T Murdoch, OBE | Australia | February 1954 to August 1954 |

== Order of battle ==
=== UK Units ===
- 1st Battalion, King's Own Scottish Borderers, July 1951 – August 1952
- 1st Battalion, King's Shropshire Light Infantry, July 1951 – September 1952
- 1st Battalion, Royal Fusiliers, August 1952 – July 1953
- 1st Battalion, Durham Light Infantry, September 1952 – July 1953

=== Australian Units ===
- 3rd Battalion, Royal Australian Regiment (3 RAR), September 1950 – July 1953
- 1st Battalion, Royal Australian Regiment (1 RAR), June 1952 – March 1953
- 2nd Battalion, Royal Australian Regiment (2 RAR), April 1953 – July 1953

=== New Zealand Units ===
- 16th Field Regiment, Royal New Zealand Artillery, April 1951 – 1954

| Preceded by 28th Infantry Brigade (United Kingdom) | 28th Commonwealth Infantry Brigade; 1951–1954 | Succeeded by 28th Commonwealth Infantry Brigade Group |
