= Mike Levey =

American infomercial host

- Levey on Amazing Discoveries
- Born: Michael Stephen Levey; May 28, 1948
- Died: August 2, 2003 (aged 55); Los Angeles, California, U.S.
- Resting place: Mount Sinai Memorial Park
- Occupation: Infomercial host
- Known for: Hosting Amazing Discoveries
- Children: 3

Michael Stephen Levey (May 28, 1948 – August 2, 2003) was an American infomercial host. He was best known for hosting Amazing Discoveries, a series of infomercials that aired on late night television from 1989 to 1997.

== Career ==
A former electrical engineer and copy writer for mail advertisements, Levey started a Dial-A-Joke line in the 1970s called The Mainline in Los Angeles. In 1988, Levey and two partners founded Positive Response Television, a company that produced infomercials.

Levey rose to fame as the host of Amazing Discoveries, a series of episodic infomercials that began airing in 1989. Amazing Discoveries consisted of over 100 episodes and aired in more than 60 countries in 12 languages. His onscreen persona as the enthusiastic "Sweater Man" was often parodied in films like The Cat in the Hat and on the comedy sketch series MADtv. Levey also appeared as himself on episodes of Sliders, Friends, and The Weird Al Show.

At the height of his fame, Levey received 500 fan letters a week and was dubbed "the most viewed person on television". The success of the Amazing Discoveries infomercials also led to a spin-off infomercial series titled Ask Mike. Levey's company, Positive Response Television, was bought by National Media in 1997. Amazing Discoveries aired its final episode the following year.

== Death ==
On August 2, 2003, Levey died from cancer at Cedars-Sinai Medical Center in Los Angeles. His private memorial was held on August 6 at Mount Sinai Memorial Park. He was survived by his wife Lisa Levey and their three children.
