= George Taylor (British Army officer) =

Brigadier George Taylor CBE DSO*
- Born: 17 September 1905; Lancashire, England
- Died: 17 July 1994 (aged 88)
- Military career
- Allegiance: United Kingdom
- Branch: British Army
- Service years: 1929–1958
- Rank: Brigadier
- Service number: 32461
- Unit: West Yorkshire Regiment
- Commands: 49th Infantry Brigade; 28th Commonwealth Infantry Brigade; 2nd Battalion, West Yorkshire Regiment; 1st Battalion, West Yorkshire Regiment; 5th Battalion, Duke of Cornwall's Light Infantry
- Conflicts: Second World War; Korean War; Mau Mau Uprising
- Awards: Commander of the Order of the British Empire; Distinguished Service Order & Bar; Knight of the Order of the Holy Sepulchre (Holy See)

Brigadier George Taylor, CBE, DSO & Bar (17 September 1905 – 17 July 1994) was a senior officer in the British Army.

== Military career ==
Taylor was commissioned into the West Yorkshire Regiment on 2 February 1929. He saw action in the Norwegian campaign and, after being evacuated, then took part in the Normandy landings. He became commanding officer of the 5th Duke of Cornwall's Light Infantry in July 1944 and, after capturing a Tiger Tank, was appointed Companion of the Distinguished Service Order; he won a bar to his DSO at the Battle of Arnhem in September 1944. According to The Independent, "he won an almost unrivalled reputation as a battle commanding officer in North-West Europe in 1944–45", and, by July 1955, "he might have been counted almost the most experienced field commander in the world".

He went on to command the 28th Commonwealth Infantry Brigade in Korea in the Korean War at the Battle of Kapyong and in Operation Commando. He later commanded the 49th Infantry Brigade in Kenya during the Mau Mau Uprising.

Sir David Willcocks witnessed George Taylor's skills 1st hand when they served closely together, and stated: "not only his great courage and inspiring leadership, but also the care with which we reconnoitred and planned every attack or defensive engagement, in order to minimise casualties ... his courage and concern called forth in all ranks a deep loyalty and affection."

He was appointed a Commander of the Order of the British Empire in 1955. He died in July 1994.
