= Battle of Maehwa-san =

1951 battle of the Korean War

- Part of the Korean War
Date	7–12 March 1951
Location	Maehwa-san, South Korea
Result	Inconclusive

Belligerents
United Nations: United Kingdom; Australia; Canada; New Zealand; United States	China; North Korea

Commanders and leaders
(United Kingdom) Basil Aubrey Coad; (Australia) Ian Ferguson; (Canada) James Stone	Unknown

The Battle of Maehwa-San was fought for control of the hills and area around Maehwa mountain between the Hoengseong County and Wonju, between 7–12 March 1951, during the Korean War. The British Empire 27th British Commonwealth Brigade was tasked with eliminating the Chinese People's Volunteer Army (PVA) and Korean People's Army (KPA) forces occupying the area.

== Prelude ==
The mountain was strategically valuable for the operations in the offensive known as Operation Ripper and was 1,085 m (3,560 ft) high. The objective was known as Operation Woodbine. The 27th British Commonwealth Brigade, led by Brigadier Basil Aubrey Coad, consisted of the 1st Battalion, Argyll and Sutherland Highlanders (1st Argylls), the 1st Battalion, Middlesex Regiment (1st Middlesex), the 2nd Battalion, Princess Patricia's Canadian Light Infantry (2nd PPCLI) and the 3rd Battalion, Royal Australian Regiment (3 RAR).

== Battle ==
=== Hill 410 ===
The offensive began on 7 March, with 3 RAR being ordered to capture Hill 410. A Company and D Company descended into the valley at 10:00 and advanced through open paddy fields under fire, then across the Asi-Ri–Punsuwon Road, to climb Hill 410. A Company ascended a third of the way up a spur before being pinned down by massed machine gun and light mortar fire. Calling for artillery and mortar support from 16th Field Regiment, Royal New Zealand Artillery and the United States Army (US), B Company 2nd Chemical Mortar Battalion, the fire support could not dislodge the PVA/KPA, who were dug in, in machine gun and rifle pits.

D Company climbed a parallel spur to the right of A Company and also found the going difficult. At 15:00, D Company finally crossed the ridge line. Snowstorms began in the afternoon and hampered the evacuation of the wounded but A Company was able to advance. B Company then joined the two forward companies to consolidate the position. 3 RAR lost 12 killed and 24 wounded, while the 2nd Chemical Mortar Battalion suffered two wounded. At 06:30 on 8 March, B Company secured the rest of Hill 410 without opposition after the PVA/KPA withdrew during the night.

=== Hills 532, 390 and 326 and 432 ===
The 2nd PPCLI secured Hill 532 and made contact with B Company, 3 RAR on 8 March.

The 1st Argylls and the 1st Middlesex began an advance on Hill 390 at 07:00 on 9 March and secured Hill 390 and other objectives without opposition.

On 10 March, the 3 RAR moved forward to capture Hill 326 and 432 overlooking the valley at the base of Maehwasan. The mountain consisted of a number of jagged ridges and its peak rose 1,500 ft (457 m) above the valley floor. The hills were occupied without opposition with the PVA/KPA forces withdrawing on 8 March to an area 5 kilometres to the north.

=== Hills 703, 752 and 642 ===
The 27th British Commonwealth Brigade began simultaneous attacks against Hill 703, Hill 752 and Hill 642. The 1st Argylls had to capture of Hill 752, 3 RAR Hill 703 and 2nd PPCLI Hill 642. At 09:00, the 1st Argylls secured the foothills that dominated the immediate area of the valley and the 1st Middlesex captured Hill 353 without opposition. While forming up for the attack 3 RAR headquarters received light mortar fire from the right flank without suffering any casualties. As A Company and C Company 3 RAR moved towards Hill 435 across the valley floor, A Company came under heavy fire from the village of Chisan to the right. The Republic of Korea Army (ROK) 6th Infantry Division had failed to attack as ordered with the result that the right flank of the brigade was exposed. 2 Platoon from A Company assaulted the village of Chisan, killing 30 PVA/KPA soldiers, before heavy mortar and machine gun fire forced the platoon to withdraw. A Company suffered two killed and seven wounded.

C Company 3 RAR had continued towards its objectives and by 15:00 was pinned down just below the ridge of Hill 703 and remained in the position throughout the night. The 2nd PPCLI and 1st Argylls were able to secure Hill 642 and Hill 752 without opposition. With the ROK 6th Division still not having moved forward, C Company, 1st Middlesex protected 3 RAR's right flank.

On 12 March, C Company had moved onto the crest and advanced to Hill 703 at 06:30. B Company and D Company 3 RAR, moved up to consolidate Hill 703, which had been abandoned hurriedly during the night. The US 7th Marine Regiment moved forward and secured the right flank of the 27th British Commonwealth Brigade.

== Aftermath ==
From 13 March, the 27th British Commonwealth Brigade was relieved by the US 5th Cavalry Regiment and moved to the reserve area at the harbour near Chipyong-ni. The Australians had suffered 14 killed and 39 wounded.
