= Battle of Kapyong =

1951 battle of the Korean War

- Part of the Chinese Spring Offensive in the Korean War
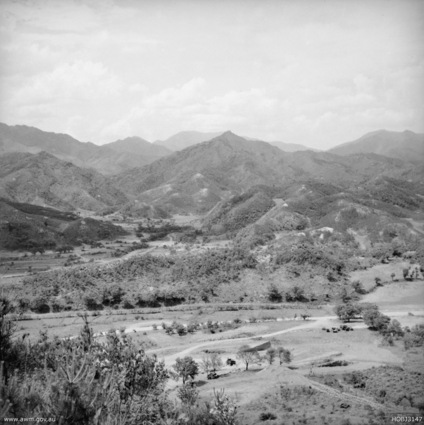
- Kapyong, South Korea
Date	22–27 April 1951
Location	Kapyong River, South Korea 37°52′36″N 127°31′48″E
Result	UN victory

Belligerents
United Nations (UNC): South Korea; United States; United Kingdom; Australia; Canada; New Zealand	China

Commanders and leaders
(United Kingdom) Brian Arthur Burke (United Kingdom) George Taylor (Australia) Bruce Ferguson (Canada) James Stone (United States) Matthew Ridgway (United States) James Van Fleet	(China) Wen Yuchen (China) Deng Yue (China) Peng Dehuai (China) Song Shilun

Units involved
(United Kingdom) 27th Brit Comm Bde: (Australia) 3 RAR; (Canada) 2 PPCLI; (United Kingdom) 1 MX; (New Zealand) 16th Field Regiment, RNZA; (First Republic of Korea) 6th Division; (United States) A Company 72nd Heavy Tank Battalion; (United States) 5th Cavalry Regiment; (United States) 213th Field Artillery Battalion; (United States) 2nd Chemical Mortar Battalion; (United States) 74th Engineer Combat Battalion	(China) 118th Division (China) 60th Division

Strength
One brigade ≈ 2,000 men	Two divisions ≈20,000 men

Casualties and losses
(Australia) 3 RAR: 32 killed, 59 wounded (Canada) 2 PPCLI: 18 killed, 38 wounded (New Zealand) 16th Field Regt: 2 killed, 5 wounded (United States) 72nd Heavy Tank Battalion: 3 killed, 12 wounded (United States) 5th Cavalry Regiment: 10 killed, several wounded Total: 65 killed at least 114 wounded	approximately 6,000 killed, many wounded

The Battle of Kapyong (Korean: 가평 전투; MR: Kap'yŏng chŏnt'u; 22–27 April 1951), also known as the Battle of Jiaping (Chinese: 加平战斗; pinyin: Jiāpíng Zhàndòu), was a pivotal engagement fought during the Korean War between United Nations Command (UN) forces—primarily Canadian, Australian, and New Zealand—and the 118th and 60th Divisions of the Chinese People's Volunteer Army (PVA). The fighting occurred during the Chinese Spring Offensive and saw the 27th British Commonwealth Brigade (27th Brigade) establish blocking positions in the Kapyong Valley, on a key route south to the capital, Seoul. The two forward battalions—the 3rd Battalion, Royal Australian Regiment (3 RAR) and 2nd Battalion, Princess Patricia's Canadian Light Infantry (2 PPCLI) were supported by guns from the 16th Field Regiment (16 NZFR) of the Royal Regiment of New Zealand Artillery and, early in the battle, with two companies of US mortars and light artillery, fifteen Sherman tanks from the US 72nd Heavy Tank Battalion, two companies of the US 74th Engineer Combat Battalion and 1st Battalion, Middlesex Regiment. These forces occupied positions astride the valley with hastily developed defences.

As thousands of soldiers from the Republic of Korea Army (ROK) began to withdraw through the valley, the PVA infiltrated the brigade position under the cover of darkness and assaulted the 3 RAR on Hill 504 during the evening and into the following day. Five companies of the US and UK forces attached to 27th Brigade fled the battlefield without orders, expecting an imminent PVA breakthrough at the Kapyong Valley. Although heavily outnumbered, the 3 RAR and US tanks held their positions into the afternoon of April 24, before retreating from the battlefield to a reserve position near brigade headquarters. Both sides suffered heavy casualties.

The PVA then turned their attention to the 2 PPCLI on Hill 677, whose encirclement prevented any resupply or reinforcements from entering. The 2 PPCLI were ordered to make a last stand on Hill 677. During a fierce night battle on 24/25 April, the PVA forces were unable to dislodge the 2 PPCLI and sustained enormous losses. The next day, the PVA largely withdrew back up the valley in order to regroup. UN forces subsequently launched counter-offensives to recover the lost areas, the US 5th Cavalry Regiment against Hill 504 and the 2 PPCLI against the northern parts of Hill 677. The 2 PPCLI were relieved late on 26 April.

The fighting helped blunt the PVA Spring Offensive. The delaying action of the 3 RAR at Hill 504 and the last stand of the 2 PPCLI at Hill 677 were critical in preventing a breakthrough against the UN central front, the encirclement of US forces in Korea, which were at that point in general retreat, and ultimately, the capture of Seoul. The 2 PPCLI and 3 RAR battalions, consisting of about 700 men each, bore the brunt of the assault and stopped PVA divisional forces estimated at 20,000 in strength during the hard-fought defensive battle. Today, the battle is regarded as the most famous and significant action fought by the Canadian and Australian armies in Korea, and the most famous battle fought by the Canadian Army since World War II.

== Background ==
=== Military situation ===
The UN Counteroffensive, February to April 1951

The UN counter-offensive between February and April 1951 had been largely successful, with the US Eighth Army pushing the PVA north of the Han River during Operation Killer, while Seoul was recaptured in mid-March during Operation Ripper and UN forces once again approached the 38th Parallel. Regardless, the strained relationship between UN commander General Douglas MacArthur and US President Harry S. Truman led to MacArthur's dismissal as Commander-in-Chief, and his replacement by General Matthew B. Ridgway.

Consequently, on 14 April 1951, General James Van Fleet replaced Ridgway as commander of the US Eighth Army and the UN forces in Korea. Ridgway flew to Tokyo the same day to replace MacArthur. Meanwhile, the offensive continued with a series of short thrusts. Operation Courageous, in late March, pushed forward to the Benton Line, 8 km (5 mi) south of the 38th Parallel, while Operation Rugged in early April pushed just north of the 38th Parallel to the Kansas Line. Finally, in mid-April a further advance moved the US Eighth Army to the Utah Line.

Following the Battle of Maehwa-San, the 27th British Commonwealth Brigade (Note: British 27th Brigade had been officially renamed as 27th British Commonwealth Brigade in September 1950 with the addition of the Australian 3 RAR and December 1950 addition of the Canadian 2 PPCLI. See "Korea and the entry of Britain into the war". Cabinet Papers. The National Archives. Retrieved 21 September 2009. https://webarchive.nationalarchives.gov.uk/ukgwa/20231023124839/https://www.nationalarchives.gov.uk/cabinetpapers/themes/korea-entry-britain-war.htm) were assigned to a period in US IX Corps reserve as the UN forces had continued to push steadily northwards. By April 1951, the brigade consisted of four infantry battalions, one Australian, one Canadian and two British, including: the 3rd Battalion, Royal Australian Regiment; 2nd Battalion, Princess Patricia's Canadian Light Infantry; 1st Battalion, Middlesex Regiment; and 1st Battalion, Argyll and Sutherland Highlanders. Brigadier Basil Coad had departed for Hong Kong on compassionate leave on 23 March and the brigade was now under the command of Brigadier Brian Burke.

In direct support was the 16th Field Regiment, Royal New Zealand Artillery (16 Fd Regt) with its 3.45 in (88 mm) 25-pounder field guns. 3 RAR was under the command of Lieutenant Colonel Bruce Ferguson. 2 PPCLI was commanded by Lieutenant Colonel James Stone. Deployed in the central sector, the brigade was attached to US IX Corps which also included the US 24th Infantry Division, ROK 2nd Infantry Division, US 7th Infantry Division and the ROK 6th Infantry Division, under the overall command of Major General William M. Hoge.

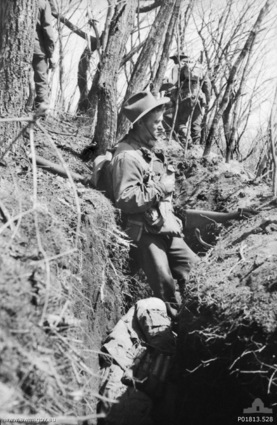
3 RAR occupying Chinese trenches on 'Salmon', 16 April 1951

During this time, 27th Brigade was attached to the US 24th Division, advancing north through the Chojong valley in late March, reaching the Benton Line on 31 March. The brigade was then released, advancing with IX Corps up the deep and narrow valley of the Kapyong River, 10 km (6.2 mi) to the east. From 3 April, the 27th Brigade moved further up the river, advancing 30 km (19 mi) over the next 12 days as part of Operation Rugged. Although the valley was not held in strength by the PVA, it was skilfully defended by small groups of infantry dug-in on the hilltops that overlooked it. Advancing along the flanking hills and ridges, the brigade captured successive positions, while encountering heavy resistance before reaching the Kansas Line on 8 April. Following a brief operational pause, the advance 5 km (3.1 mi) to the Utah Line began on 11 April, the day after MacArthur's dismissal. PVA resistance strengthened noticeably; as a result, the brigade's initial objectives were not captured until 13 April.

The approach to the Utah Line was dominated by two 900 m (3,000 ft) hills—the 'Sardine' feature 1 km (0.62 mi) north, and 'Salmon', a further 800 m (870 yd) north. A Middlesex company was repulsed twice in attempts to capture Sardine on 14 April, before the task was allocated to 3 RAR. A Company, 3 RAR subsequently captured the crest, killing 10 PVA and wounding another 20 for the loss of eight 3 RAR wounded. The following morning, Salmon was captured by C Company without firing a shot, amidst light resistance. PVA shelling after its capture resulted in two men wounded, while airstrikes then broke up an attempted PVA counter-attack. Meanwhile, 2 PPCLI continued their advance on the right flank, capturing the 'Turbot' feature (Hill 795) on 15 April. Facing a spirited PVA delaying action on successive positions, the 2 PPCLI did not capture their final objective—the 'Trout' feature (Hill 826)—until the following morning.

== Chinese Spring Offensive ==
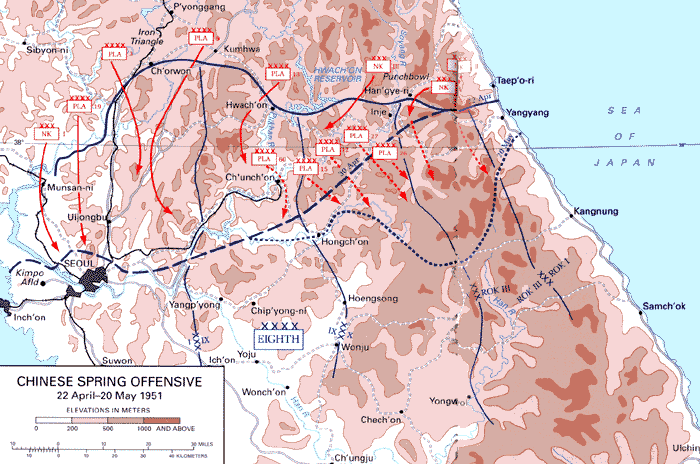
Chinese Spring Offensive, late April 1951

=== Preparations ===
After reaching the Utah Line, 27th Brigade was withdrawn from the front on 17 April, handing over its positions to the ROK 6th Division. Burke subsequently ordered his battalions into reserve positions north of the previously destroyed village of Kapyong, on the main road from Seoul to the east coast. Intelligence indicated that a new PVA offensive was imminent, and while the brigade settled in to rest, it remained on three hours' notice to move to support IX Corps. Having been on operations continuously for the past seven months, the 27th Brigade intended to relieve the bulk of its forces during its period in reserve. Two of the battalions—the Argylls and the Middlesex—would be replaced by two fresh battalions from Hong Kong. Advance parties from Brigade Headquarters and the Argylls departed for Seoul en route for Hong Kong on 19 April, while the remaining battalions were scheduled to depart two weeks later. 3 RAR would not be rotated and remained a part of the brigade for the entire war, operating on an individual reinforcement system instead.

Meanwhile, planning began for Operation Dauntless, a drive 30 km (19 mi) into the Iron Triangle—a key PVA/Korean People's Army (KPA) concentration area and communications junction in the central sector between Chorwon and Kumwha in the south and Pyonggang in the north. Contingency planning also included precautions against a new major PVA offensive, in which the US Eighth Army would conduct a delaying defence on successive positions. Further indications of an imminent offensive—including the visible strengthening of PVA/KPA artillery and logistic systems—led Ridgway to order Van Fleet not to exploit any opportunities beyond the Wyoming Line. Confident nonetheless, Ridgway widened the scope of the offensive, designating a secondary objective line in the eastern sector known as the Alabama Line. Fate would intervene, however, and Van Fleet launched his offensive on 21 April only to be met by a much stronger PVA/KPA offensive the following night.

=== Launch of Chinese Spring Offensive ===
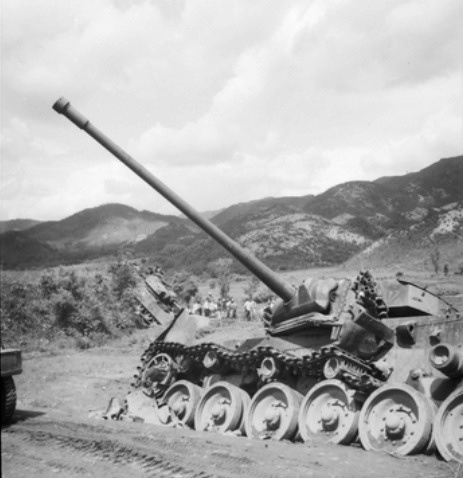
A British Centurion tank disabled during the Battle of the Imjin River, late April 1951

The Chinese Spring Offensive—also known as the Chinese Fifth Phase Campaign, First Impulse—envisioned the total destruction of US I and IX Corps above the Han River, involving three PVA Army Groups—the 3rd, 9th and 19th Army Groups—and three KPA Corps—the I, III and V Corps—under the overall command of Peng Dehuai. (Note: The Chinese military did not have ranks during the 1950s, except for the title of "Commander" or "Commissar".) With the immediate objective of capturing Seoul, the offensive commenced on 22 April on two broad fronts: the main thrust across the Imjin River in the western sector held by the US I Corps, involving 337,000 troops driving towards Seoul, and the secondary effort involving 149,000 troops attacking further east across the Soyang River in the central and eastern sectors, falling primarily on US IX Corps, and to a lesser extent, on US X Corps' sector. A further 214,000 PVA troops supported the offensive; in total more than 700,000 men. As part of the preparation, the battle-hardened 39th and 40th Armies of the 13th Army Group were transferred to the 9th Army Group under the overall command of Song Shi-Lun, and Commander Wen Yuchen of the 40th Army was given the mission of destroying the ROK 6th Division while blocking any UN reinforcements towards the Imjin River at Kapyong. (Note: In Chinese military nomenclature, the term "Army" (军) means Corps, while the term "Army Group" (集团军) means Field Army.)

Facing the offensive were 418,000 UN troops, including 152,000 ROK, 245,000 Americans, 11,500 British Commonwealth and 10,000 troops from other UN countries. However, with the US Eighth Army not strong enough to prevent large penetrations along its line, masses of PVA infantry soon swept around its flanks, surrounding entire formations in an attempt to cut off their withdrawal. Standing directly in the path of the main PVA attack towards Seoul in the I Corps sector was the 29th British Brigade. The brigade's stand on the Imjin River held off two PVA divisions for two days and ultimately helped prevent the capture of Seoul, but resulted in heavy casualties in one of the bloodiest British engagements of the war. The 29th Brigade suffered 1,091 casualties in their defence of the Kansas Line, and they destroyed a large portion of the PVA 63rd Army and inflicted nearly 10,000 casualties. Meanwhile, further east, in the IX Corps sector, the PVA 118th Division, 40th Army and the 60th Division, 20th Army prepared to attack the ROK 6th Division on the night of 22 April.

=== South Korean withdrawal, 22–23 April 1951 ===
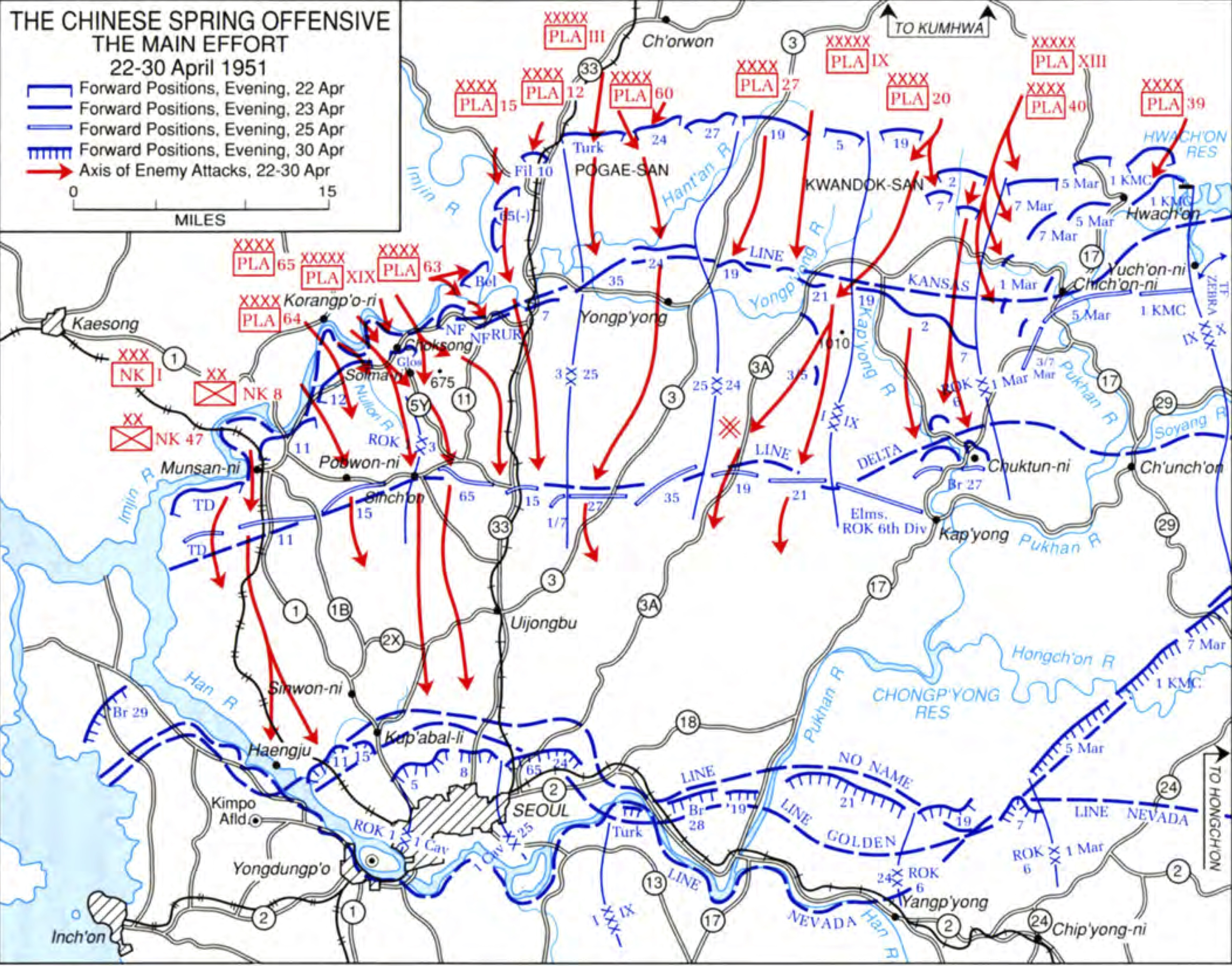
Western and Central fronts, Chinese Spring Offensive, late April 1951

The ROK were holding positions at the northern end of the Kapyong Valley, having advanced 10 km (6.2 mi) since relieving the 27th Brigade. However, anticipating a PVA attack, the divisional commander—General Chang Do Yong—had halted his advance at 16:00 and ordered his two forward regiments—the 19th and the 2nd Infantry Regiments—to tie-in and develop defensive positions. Meanwhile, the 7th Infantry Regiment occupied reserve positions immediately behind the forward regiments. The ROK 6th Division had been bolstered by the attachment of 16 NZFR and a battery of 105 mm (4.1 in) M101 howitzers from the US 213th Field Artillery Battalion. Regardless, left with only one hour to halt its advance and step up defences, the forward ROK units were only able to occupy a series of hill-top positions while leaving the valleys and flanks exposed.

Two PVA divisions—the 118th and the 60th Division—struck at 17:00, easily infiltrating through numerous gaps between the badly organised defensive positions. Under pressure all along the front, the defenders gave ground almost immediately and soon broke. Abandoning their weapons, equipment, and vehicles, they disintegrated and began to stream south out of the mountains and through the valley, and by 23:00, Chang was forced to admit that he had lost all communication with his units. At 04:00, the decision was made to withdraw 16 NZFR to prevent their loss. However, following reports that the ROK were making a stand, they were ordered back up the valley the next morning with the Middlesex accompanying them as protection. By dusk, it was clear that the ROK units had collapsed, and the guns were withdrawn again.

Meanwhile, the US 1st Marine Division was holding firm against the PVA 39th Army to the east, and the withdrawal of the ROK had left their flank exposed. However, with the PVA 39th and 40th Armies only tasked with protecting the eastern flank of the 9th Army Group against possible counterattacks from the 1st Marine Division, the PVA did not exploit this opportunity and the US forces remained relatively unmolested. Yet with the forward UN positions in both the US I Corps and US IX Corps sectors increasingly untenable as the PVA exploited gaps between formations, Van Fleet ordered a withdrawal to the Kansas Line in the mid-morning.

Hoge subsequently ordered the US Marines to form a new defensive position beyond the Pukhan River, between the Hwachon Reservoir and the new position to be occupied by the ROK 6th Division. Hoge's plan relied on the ROK reforming and offering some resistance, and although a rearguard of 2,500 men was belatedly established, it was in no condition to fight. Fearing a breakthrough, Hoge ordered the 27th Brigade, as the corps' reserve, to establish defensive positions north of Kapyong on the afternoon of 23 April as a precaution in the event the ROK were unable to hold, tasking them with blocking the two approaches to the village and to prevent the PVA from cutting Route 17, a key route south to Seoul and an important main supply route.

Chinese forces pursuing South Korean troops near Kapyong

The brigade was by now reduced to three battalions, as the Argylls had been withdrawn to Pusan just prior to the battle, in preparation for their embarkation. The Middlesex were also on stand-by for embarkation and were kept in reserve. As such, with the width of the valley precluding the establishment of a continuous linear defensive line, Burke was forced to place his two available battalions on the high points on either side of it, with 3 RAR occupying Hill 504 to the east of the river and 2 PPCLI occupying Hill 677 to the west. Meanwhile, Sudok San (Hill 794) to the north-west—a massive hill nearly 800 m (2,600 ft) high—was left undefended by necessity. Together, these three hills formed a naturally strong defensive position, well-suited to blocking a major advance.

Regardless, the brigade position suffered from a number of deficiencies, being exposed without flank protection, while the central sector was not occupied because the Middlesex were away to the north with the guns. Likewise, until the return of 16 NZFR, the Brigade would have little artillery support. As such, if large PVA forces arrived before these two units returned, the two forward battalions would be without support and would have to accept the probability that they would be cut-off. 3 RAR—whose line of communications ran 4 km (2.5 mi) through the exposed central sector of the valley—would be particularly exposed.

Each of the battalions were deployed across the summits and slopes in separate company-sized defensive positions, creating a series of strong-points across a 7 km (4.3 mi) front. Due to the large amount of ground to be defended, each of the companies were spread widely, and were unable to offer mutual support. Instead, each platoon would support each other, with each company adopting all-round defence. Brigade Headquarters remained in the valley, 4 km (2.5 mi) to the south. With 16 NZFR still forward supporting the ROK, US IX Corps placed a battery of 105 mm (4.1 in) howitzers from the US 213th Field Artillery Battalion and the twelve 4.2 in (110 mm) M2 mortars of B Company, 2nd Chemical Mortar Battalion, under the command of 27th Brigade. Fifteen Sherman tanks from A Company, US 72nd Heavy Tank Battalion, were also in support. Also attached to the Brigade were two companies of the US 74th Engineer Combat Battalion who bivouacked on the hills nearby the 3 RAR positions.

The 2 PPCLI subsequently occupied Hill 677 and began digging-in, deploying their six Vickers machine guns in sections to add depth, and using defensive fire tasks to cover the gaps in their positions. Meanwhile, the 3 RAR occupied Hill 504, with D Company holding the summit itself, A Company the spur-line which ran down to the north-west, and B Company the small hill by the river, while C Company was in reserve on the rear spur. In response to US IX Corps' requirements, Burke directed Ferguson to site his headquarters in the low ground of the valley in the vicinity of the hamlet of Chuktun-ni, so as to control the withdrawing ROK. However, this would limit Ferguson's situational awareness and his ability to control the battle, while also leaving them exposed to infiltration. The afternoon was spent on the lightly scrub-covered slopes digging-in and building sangars where the rocky ground proved too hard. In only a few hours, the 3 RAR managed to prepare defensive positions, although defensive fire tasks were unable to be registered as the artillery forward observers were unable to reach the company positions until after dark.

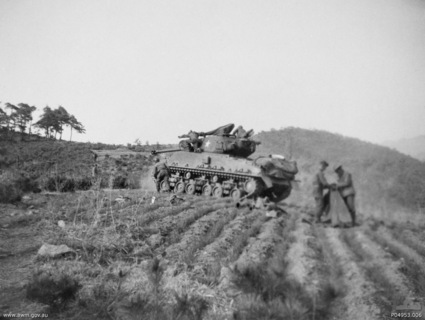
American M4A3E8 Sherman tank at Kapyong just hours before the battle

The US tank company commander—Lieutenant Kenneth W. Koch—deployed his platoons in support of the 3 RAR. The road skirted the eastern flank of Hill 504, and it offered the best area for the employment of armour. One platoon of five tanks occupied a northern outpost position forward of B Company to prevent the PVA using the road; another platoon occupied the high ground to the west, with B Company; while the final platoon and Koch's command tank was deployed near battalion headquarters, covering a ford by which the road crossed the Kapyong River, approximately 800 m (870 yd) south of B Company. The tanks were deployed without infantry support. The command relationship between the 3 RAR and their armoured support was also complicated, as the US tanks were not under command as they might normally have been. Rather, Koch was free to conduct his own battle. Regardless, armed with a 76 mm (3 in) cannon and one .50 caliber and two 30 caliber machine guns, the Sherman tanks were formidable assets and bolstered the defence considerably. In contrast, the PVA had no tanks at Kapyong, while their infantry had only a few 3.5 in (89 mm) anti-tank rockets with which to counter them.

By 20:00 that evening, a large number of ROK were retreating in disarray through a gap in the line held by the brigade, the majority of them moving through the 3 RAR positions. The ROK 6th Division later regrouped in positions behind 27th Brigade, but was now reduced to less than half its original strength. Meanwhile, as the 20th Army veered to the west as part of the PVA main effort against Seoul, the PVA 118th Division and 60th Division continued a secondary advance down the Kapyong Valley, closely pursuing the retreating ROK. (Note: Both the PVA 60th and 118th Divisions have been identified as taking part in the Battle of Kapyong. O'Neill, Wood, and Perkins identify the PVA 60th Division involved throughout the Battle of Kapyong based on results of military intelligence and prisoner interviews; however, it has been suggested in some US sources that at least part of the 60th Division had possibly maintained its south-westerly course as part of the 20th Army and had possibly not pursued the ROK 19th Infantry Regiment after routing it in the Kapyong valley. Following the Battle of Kapyong, the PVA 60th Division next contacted the US 24th Division in the I Corps sector. See Mossman 1990, p. 402.) Racing down the north-east-running valley, the PVA 354th Regiment reached the 3 RAR positions by about 22:00. Intent on capturing the important crossroads of Route 17 south of Kapyong, and most likely unaware of the location of the Australian blocking position, the PVA vanguard remained in the low ground, splitting as they approached a long, low north–south running ridge that rose like an island in the mouth of the valley.

== Australian 3 RAR defence of Hill 504, 23–24 April 1951 ==
=== Night battle ===
The Battle of Kapyong, 22–25 April 1951

Having successfully prevented the US 1st Marine Division from reinforcing the Imjin River front, the PVA 40th Army turned its attention towards the 27th Brigade on 23 April. The battle started during the night of 23/24 April, and continued until late in the day on 27 April, as the PVA 118th Division and 60th Division, totaling perhaps 20,000 men under the command of Deng Yue—engaged the two forward battalions of 27th British Commonwealth Brigade. The initial PVA attack at Kapyong engaged the 700 men of 3 RAR on Hill 504, while in the early part of the battle, the Middlesex and 16 NZFR gunners were all but cut off. However, the resistance of the 3 RAR ultimately allowed them to safely withdraw from the battlefield and the Middlesex then moved into a reserve position astride the western bank of the river. The PVA 60th Division and two battalions of the PVA 354th Regiment launched repeated attacks on the two forward 3 RAR companies on the north-west spur of Hill 504. Assaults of massed PVA troops kept up the attack throughout the night, but the defence of the 3 RAR on the brigade's right flank held them back until the 3 RAR was forced to retreat to Brigade HQ on the early afternoon of the 24th. The PVA would then turn their attention to the 700 soldiers of the 2 PPCLI during the evening of the 24th and the morning of the 25th.

Using the retreating ROK troops to cover their movements, the PVA had infiltrated the brigade position in the initial stages of the battle, penetrating between A and B Companies, 3 RAR astride the road, and largely surrounding the latter before moving into the rear positions. The 3 RAR soldiers struggled to distinguish the PVA from the ROK in the dark, although the Korean Service Corps porters attached to the battalion were able to provide valuable assistance to the defenders distinguishing the PVA by the sounds of their voices. At 21:30, the PVA launched their first attack on the forward platoon of US tanks, which had been posted on the road without infantry support. The initial moves were easily repelled. However, a stronger attack an hour later forced the tanks to withdraw after two of the tank commanders were killed, including the platoon commander. The PVA then proceeded to assault the 3 RAR on two different axes: one against the two forward companies in front of Hill 504, and the other through the valley astride the road around battalion headquarters. Finally, by 23:00, 16 NZFR artillery had returned to the brigade, although they provided only limited support throughout the rest of the night.

Probes began on the A and B Company positions, and a number of assaults occurred during the night. Utilising indirect fires, the PVA charged forward in waves, only to be beaten back by the 3 RAR's Bren light machine guns, Owen submachine guns, rifle fire and grenades, before again regrouping and attacking again. B Company—under the command of Captain Darcy Laughlin—supported by tanks, drove off each assault, inflicting heavy casualties while emerging almost unscathed. Laughlin's command post was fired upon by a number of PVA that had infiltrated the company position, but they were swiftly driven out. An outpost on the northern knoll reported PVA massing on their flanks at 23:00, and although heavy artillery was directed against the attackers, the section was forced to break contact and withdraw to the main defensive position. The main PVA assault began at 00:50, falling on 4 Platoon but was broken up after an hour of heavy fighting. A second assault was mounted on 6 Platoon at 03:30, following a feint against 5 Platoon. With determination, the PVA swept forward, penetrating the 6 Platoon perimeter before being ejected by an equally determined counter-attack by 6 Platoon with Sherman tanks in support. At 04:00, a small outpost to the rear of the company position was attacked by more than 50 PVA. Held by just four men under the command of Lance Corporal Ray Parry, the 3 RAR fought off four separate attacks, killing more than 25 and wounding many more over the space of twenty minutes. Parry was later awarded the Military Medal for his actions. A final assault on B Company was made just at dawn at 04:45 by about 70 PVA, and was again repulsed.

Further up the ridge, A Company—under Major Ben O'Dowd—faced a tougher task, and came under heavy attack. The first probes began at 21:30, targeting 1 Platoon, which was the lowest of the three platoons on the west flank. The initial moves were then followed up by major PVA assaults from three sides over the next three hours. Despite suffering many casualties, the PVA continued their attack, closing in and attacking 1 Platoon with hand grenades. 1 Platoon also suffered numerous casualties, with more than half the platoon killed or wounded, including all three Bren gunners. Fighting back with small arms fire, they held against repeated assaults, which increased in frequency and strength as the PVA assaulted. By 01:00, O'Dowd ordered the survivors of 1 Platoon to withdraw through Company Headquarters into a new position in-between 2 and 3 Platoons. The PVA attacks then continued against 3 Platoon, lasting until 04:30, although they were not made with the same weight as the previous assaults.

Meanwhile, the 16 NZFR gunline had also been probed during the early morning and 16 NZFR was forced to redeploy at 03:00 to a position 4 miles (6.4 km) away, behind 27th Brigade HQ. The two US mortar and howitzer companies simply fled on foot before midnight without firing a single round, with B Company, 2nd Chemical Mortar Battalion abandoning their mortars, weapons and 50 trucks full of ammunition and supplies to the PVA. B Company found a minor road and hiked 10 miles (16 km) east to Chunchon before resting. The 213th Field Artillery Battalion, after a circuitous escape route, eventually redeployed away from the battlefield south of Brigade HQ.

By dawn, it was clear that the PVA had succeeded in penetrating the perimeter through a gap between the 3 RAR platoons, and they began to engage them with machine guns from a defilade position covered from fire by a steep dip in the ridgeline, and concealed by thick scrub. In the growing light, 1 and 3 Platoon were soon pinned down and suffered a number of casualties as they attempted to gain better fire positions with which to engage their attackers. At 06:00, a fighting patrol was dispatched to make contact with Company Headquarters, and as the section passed over a false crest on their way down the spur line, they encountered the PVA positions by chance. Attacking immediately, six PVA were killed for the loss of one 3 RAR, and the threat to A Company was eliminated. O'Dowd then launched a counter-attack with 3 Platoon, assaulting the PVA occupying the original 1 Platoon position. By 07:00, they had regained the feature and the PVA were forced to withdraw under heavy fire from the 3 RAR platoons on the high ground, who again exacted a heavy toll. The night's fighting had cost A Company dearly, however, and among the dead were the two 16 NZFR forward observers. In total, they suffered more than 50 casualties—half their original strength. Meanwhile, on the right flank, D Company—under Captain Norm Gravener—held the summit of Hill 504 and was not heavily engaged during the night, while C Company—commanded by Captain Reg Saunders—was attacked only once.

Located 1,500 m (1,600 yd) to the rear, Battalion Headquarters found itself heavily pressed, however. Protected by a section of Vickers machine guns, two 17-pounder anti-tank guns, the Assault Pioneer Platoon, and the Regimental Police under the Headquarters Company commander—Captain Jack Gerke, plus Koch's own commanding tank platoon—the fighting flared around 22:00 as the PVA infiltrated the position among the retreating ROK. They bypassed the headquarters and the US tanks nearby, surrounding the defenders and establishing blocking positions on the road to the south. During the night, the PVA attempted to mount the tanks and destroy them with grenades and satchel charges, but were driven off by fire. Later, one of the tanks received a direct hit from a 3.5 inch rocket, while the forward perimeter was struck heavily by attacking waves of PVA, and was forced back with heavy casualties. Receiving fire from PVA soldiers occupying several houses in the village of Chuktun-ni, the Shermans engaged the roadblock and several houses, and estimated more than 40 PVA killed in one house alone.

There was a sudden and fundamental restructuring among the 3 RAR command personnel at this point in the battle. At dawn of 24 April, the PVA intensified their attack on the 3 RAR battalion headquarters' perimeter, killing and wounding the bulk of the Medium Machine Gun section and the Assault Pioneer Platoon and driving them off the higher ground they had been occupying, although A Company remained in full command of the hill. At this point, Ferguson requested further reinforcements from Burke, and at 04:00 Burke ordered a Middlesex company forward in support of Ferguson's battalion HQ. However, on encountering some PVA resistance in the hills edging the Kapyong road, the Middlesex company suddenly decided to abandon their ordered assignment. They then turned east and escaped the battlefield using the same minor road discovered earlier by the US mortar company during its escape. By 05:00, apparently shaken by the inexplicable disappearance of the Middlesex company, Ferguson was concerned that the PVA from the direction of the hill could eventually develop the potential to fire towards battalion headquarters. Ferguson made the sudden decision to immediately withdraw 5 km (3.1 mi) away from the battlefield to a new position to the rear, inside the Middlesex perimeter. However, Ferguson did not communicate with his company commanders regarding his decision to relocate, and O'Dowd and other officers were surprised in the morning to find that Ferguson had apparently disappeared. With Ferguson's departure from his field HQ, O'Dowd, as the senior company commander, assumed field command of 3 RAR, which Ferguson confirmed to O'Dowd by radio communication. Ferguson's absence from the battlefield and the intermittent nature of communications with his field officers made it increasingly difficult for him to communicate, monitor, and control his units on the battlefield.

Ferguson led his battalion HQ staff in the departure between 05:15 and 06:00, escorted by some of the US tanks. However, difficulties ensued with Ferguson's personal vehicles. A PVA mortar round blew the wheel off of Ferguson's own jeep, which was abandoned, while the tanks opened fire and drove off the attackers. Ferguson's subsequent vehicle, a converted two-and-a-half tonne truck, became bogged down during the withdrawal and had to be destroyed.

The two companies of the US 74th Engineer Combat Battalion encamped adjacent to 3 RAR on the hillside had witnessed Ferguson's departure. Mistaking his movement as a general retreat, they fled the battlefield on foot, abandoning their trucks and equipment.

During Ferguson's withdrawal, two 3 RAR soldiers were left behind and were subsequently captured by the PVA. Signaller Private Horace Madden was later posthumously awarded the George Cross, following his death from malnutrition and ill-treatment. (Note: During his captivity Madden resisted repeated Chinese and North Korean attempts to make him collaborate, despite repeated beatings and being deprived of food. He remained cheerful and optimistic for six months, sharing his meagre food with other prisoners who were sick. He grew progressively weaker though and died of malnutrition on 6 November 1951. For his conduct he was posthumously awarded the George Cross. See O'Neill 1985, p. 147.)

Captain Gerke, in charge of 3 RAR battalion HQ defence, was unaware that Ferguson had removed himself and his staff from the battlefield, and was searching for Ferguson around the battlefield area, concerned about his disappearance. At 06:00, Gerke was approached by a jeep from Ferguson's new HQ location, who announced, "Bug-out! Battalion HQ is back down the road." Gerke ordered his men to withdraw gradually, moving one vehicle at a time back along the road, as those that remained provided covering fire. The departure was successfully completed, and with 3 RAR Headquarters Company finally assembled inside the Middlesex perimeter, Gerke was then ordered to secure a key ford across the Kapyong River, 2 km (1.2 mi) east, as a possible withdrawal route for the battalion should it later have to retire from Hill 504.

Communications between Ferguson's 3 RAR HQ and Burke's 27th Brigade HQ had failed early, while communications between Ferguson's HQ and the 3 RAR forward companies were also poor. This was mostly due to the large number of ROK retreating through their position, tearing out the line from the 3 RAR HQ, as well the effect of heavy vehicle traffic and gunfire on the exposed line. Likewise, direct radio communication with the forward companies on the 3 RAR command net with the new Type 31 VHF radios was obstructed by the rugged terrain due to the siting of 3 RAR headquarters in low ground relative to the forward companies and the requirement for line-of-sight. The forward companies were able to maintain communications with each other, but not with Ferguson's headquarters, while the company level nets also functioned well. Ultimately, contact was maintained between Ferguson and Burke through a radio set in the Middlesex Battalion Headquarters, while messages to O'Dowd and the forward companies engaged on the battlefield relied on line and a slow relay through C Company. These issues had only further complicated the conduct of the defence on the first night, with the co-ordination of the battlefield arrangements falling to O'Dowd, who had now assumed field command of 3 RAR. The next morning, O'Dowd finally managed to get through on a radio phone to a general in the US 1st Marine Division. The officer was incredulous, thinking it was a PVA agent speaking. He told O'Dowd that the 3 RAR no longer existed and that it had been wiped out the night before. O'Dowd replied, "I've got news for you. We're still here and we're staying here."

The PVA attacks had been launched quickly and aggressively, placing their light machine guns on the flank in support and attempting to close to attack the 3 RAR perimeter with grenades. Contrary to some contemporary western accounts, the PVA did not use human wave tactics. Rather, using a tactic known as 'one-point-two sides', they used massed forces and infiltration to achieve local numerical superiority and to penetrate the gaps between the forward companies, before attempting to envelop the 3 RAR while drawing their fire to the front, away from their threatened flanks. They would normally attempt to close with UN defensive positions using darkness or poor visibility to cover their movement and to counter US air superiority, before attacking using massed force, coordinated with close fire support. However, although normally well-planned and closely supported by machine-gun, mortar, and artillery fire, PVA attacks in Korea were often inflexible in execution once launched. This was mostly due to the lack of radio communications below battalion-level, with the PVA instead relying on whistle blasts, bugle calls, and runners for command and control, and although their 60 mm (2.4 in) and 81 mm (3.2 in) mortars had provided particularly effective indirect fire support, these problems were again evident during the fighting at Kapyong. Later, it was estimated that more than 500 PVA were killed by the 3 RAR and the US tanks that supported them.

=== Day battle ===
Chinese prisoners captured by B Company, 3 RAR, 24 April 1951

As daylight broke, 16 NZFR were now in place to offer artillery support and the PVA found themselves highly exposed in the open ground in front of the 3 RAR. A and B Company, supported by artillery, mortars, and tanks, directed heavy fire towards the PVA positions, forcing them to withdraw, leaving hundreds of casualties behind on the slopes. With the 3 RAR remaining in possession of their original defensive locations, the immediate situation had stabilised, although they were now effectively cut-off 4 km (2.5 mi) behind the front. Ammunition, food, and medical supplies were now extremely low throughout the forward area and with casualty evacuation increasingly difficult, the battalion was at risk of being overrun unless it could be concentrated, resupplied and supported. As such, in order to avoid each company being isolated and overwhelmed in a series of PVA attacks, at 07:15 B Company was ordered to leave its position and join the other companies on the high ground to form a defendable battalion position. B Company subsequently withdrew as instructed, taking several dozen PVA prisoners with them that had been captured earlier by a standing patrol. 16 NZFR covered their movement across the open valley, laying a smoke screen to conceal the withdrawal, while the US tanks also provided support. As they moved across the valley, B Company exchanged a number of shots with small groups of PVA who were still hiding in dead ground and in the riverbed, and saw numerous dead from the fighting the previous night. One hundred and seventy-three dead PVA were counted on the B Company perimeter by the 3 RAR before they departed.

With B Company successfully occupying its new positions, Ferguson returned forward to the hillside below his forward companies as a passenger inside a Sherman tank, which afforded protection from small arms fire. During the drive back from his new battalion HQ position, Ferguson found himself assisting in the loading of the tank machine guns when necessary to return fire at the enemy. Just after 09:00, a group of PVA launched an attack at the top of the spur held by C Company. The attack was repulsed, and no further assaults were made against C Company during the day, although they endured sniper fire and mortar bombardment for several hours.

With Burke now realising the importance of B Company's previous position to a planned counter-offensive, two hours after their withdrawal, Ferguson ordered Laughlin to re-occupy the position which they had just vacated. Ferguson summoned O'Dowd to meet him at the former battalion HQ area and advised him that Burke had ordered B Company to return to the hill they had vacated. 27th Brigade was now expecting to be reinforced by 5th U.S. Cavalry Regiment, and their move forward would possibly be facilitated if the PVA were cleared from the small hill that commanded the road through the valley. Likewise, the defence of this position the previous evening had prevented a PVA assault on the western flank of Hill 504. As such, at 09:30 the order to withdraw was rescinded and B Company was tasked to re-occupy the position. In preparation for the company assault on the summit, Laughlin tasked 5 Platoon to assault a small knoll halfway between C Company and the old B Company position. A frontal assault was launched at 10:30, with two sections attacking and one in fire support. Strongly held by a PVA platoon well dug-in in bunkers, the defenders allowed the 5 Platoon to approach to within 15 m (16 yd) before opening fire with machine guns, rifles, and grenades. 5 Platoon suffered seven casualties, including the platoon commander, and they were forced to withdraw under the cover of machine-gun and mortar fire.

4 Platoon, under Lieutenant Leonard Montgomerie, took over the attack, while a number of US tanks moved in to provide further support. Conducting a right flanking attack, 4 Platoon suffered a number of casualties as they moved across the open ground. Advancing to within 30 m (33 yd) of the forward trenches, the PVA fire increased. Montgomerie launched a desperate bayonet charge, while a section under Corporal Donald Davie broke in on the right. Amid fierce hand-to-hand fighting, 4 Platoon cleared the PVA from the trenches, losing three men. Davie's section was then heavily engaged by machine guns from the rear trenches, and he moved quickly to assault these with his remaining men. Montgomerie reorganised the platoon, and they fought from trench to trench using bayonets and grenades. 4 Platoon then began taking fire from another knoll to their front and, leaving his rear sections to clear the first position, Montgomerie led Davie's section onto the second knoll. Against such aggression the PVA were unable to hold and, although the majority fought to the death, others fled across the open ground. By 12:30, the knoll had been captured by 4 Platoon, with 57 PVA dead counted on the first position and another 24 on the second.

However, a large PVA force was now detected occupying the old B Company position and 4 Platoon was effectively halted halfway to the objective. Before Laughlin could prepare his next move, he was ordered to withdraw by Ferguson, who was relaying orders from Burke pursuant to a new appraisal of the situation, and the attempted assault to dislodge the PVA and recover the hill was abandoned. O'Dowd attributed the failure of the assault to Ferguson's plan of attack, which had neglected to include artillery support from 16 NZFR for the infantry.

Ferguson then withdrew from the area in the US tank and returned to his new HQ to the rear of the battlefield. During the fighting, the tanks had provided invaluable support, moving ammunition forward to B Company, and helping to evacuate the wounded. The entire operation had cost the 3 RAR three killed and nine wounded. For his actions, Montgomerie was awarded the Military Cross, while Davie received the Military Medal.

Meanwhile, the PVA shifted their attention to D Company, launching a series of relentless assaults against the summit. D Company's position was vital to the defence of Hill 504, commanding the high ground and protecting the 3 RAR right flank. Commencing at 07:00, the PVA assaulted the forward platoon—12 Platoon, launching attacks at 30 minute intervals until 10:30. Using mortars to cover their movement, they attacked on a narrow front up the steep slope using grenades. However, 12 Platoon beat the PVA back, killing more than 30 for the loss of seven wounded during six attacks. 16 NZFR again played a key role in defeating the PVA attempts, bringing down accurate fire within 50 m (55 yd) of the 12 Platoon positions. However, throughout the fighting, the supply of ammunition for the guns had caused severe problems, as the PVA offensive had depleted the stock of 25-pounder rounds available forward of the airhead in Seoul. Despite improvements, problems with the logistic system remained and each round had to be used effectively in response to the directions of the artillery forward observers who controlled their fire. Although badly wounded, Corporal William Rowlinson was later awarded the Distinguished Conduct Medal for his leadership, while Private Ronald Smith was awarded the Military Medal. Lance Corporal Henry Richey was posthumously mentioned in dispatches after being fatally wounded attempting to evacuate the last of the 12 Platoon casualties.

Despite their previous failures, the PVA launched another series of attacks from 11:30 and these attacks continued for the next two hours, again targeting 12 Platoon under the command of Lieutenant John Ward. Failing to break through again, the PVA suffered heavy casualties before the assault ended. From 13:30, there was another lull in the fighting for an hour and a half, although D Company continued to endure PVA mortar, machine-gun, and rifle fire. Believing that the battle may continue into the night, Gravener made the decision to pull 12 Platoon back in order to adopt a tighter company perimeter, lest his forward platoon be overrun and destroyed. The movement was completed without incident and, shortly after, the newly vacated position was assaulted by a large PVA force which had failed to detect the withdrawal. The PVA moved quickly as they attempted to establish their position on the northern end of the ridge, only to be heavily engaged by 3 RAR machine-gun and rifle fire, and artillery.

Burke's 27th Brigade HQ was reinforced on the afternoon of 24 April by the arrival of two battalions of the US 5th Cavalry Regiment. These had been dispatched earlier in the day to the Brigade, and one of the battalions was subsequently deployed to the southwest of Hill 677 in order to cover the Brigade HQ left flank. The second 5th Cavalry Regiment battalion occupied a position across the river, southeast of the Middlesex, providing cover for Brigade HQ right flank. Likewise, despite heavy casualties in one of the 3 RAR companies and battalion headquarters, 3 RAR would emerge from the intense battle largely intact and would successfully withdraw to Brigade HQ. Meanwhile, one of the replacement British battalions, the 1st Battalion, King's Own Scottish Borderers, had also arrived during the 24th and it took up positions with the 3 RAR around Brigade Headquarters. However, these forces collected near Brigade HQ would not attempt to engage the PVA or to form a relief column to attempt to break the PVA control of access to the supply trail from Tungmudae for the embattled and surrounded Hill 677, as Burke would inform the 2 PCCLI on the evening of 24 April.

=== 3 RAR withdraws ===
Although originally intent on holding until the 3 RAR could be relieved by the 5th Cavalry Regiment, Burke had decided during the morning to withdraw 3 RAR from Hill 504 and retreat to 27th Brigade HQ. This decision had prompted Burke to cancel B Company's assault. With the 3 RAR facing the potential of an eventual encirclement, Burke had ordered a withdrawal back to the Middlesex area to new defensive positions in the rear of the brigade. Indeed, despite holding the PVA at bay throughout the morning and afternoon, the increasing difficulty of resupply and casualty evacuation made it clear that the 3 RAR would be unable to hold Hill 504 for another night in its exposed and isolated positions. O'Dowd began planning for the withdrawal as the PVA renewed their assault on D Company around 11:30, and after Ferguson ordered O'Dowd to plan and lead the withdrawal by radio at 12:30. Stone on Hill 677 overheard on the radio net Ferguson order O'Dowd, "..withdraw as best you can to the Middlesex positions, I can no longer keep control." With the PVA dominating the road south, O'Dowd ordered his companies to withdraw along a ridge running 3 km (1.9 mi) south-west from Hill 504, just east of the Kapyong River. The Middlesex position lay a further one km (0.62 mi) south-west of the foot of the ridge and could be reached by the ford secured earlier by Gerke, which would act as the battalion check point for the withdrawal. Ferguson saw his role as representing 3 RAR at Brigade HQ, and had, as such, decided to not move forward to lead the withdrawal himself. O'Dowd decided to temporarily hand over command of A Company to the second-in-command, Captain Bob Murdoch.

Having been present at the Battle of Pakchon in November 1950, O'Dowd understood first-hand the dangers of withdrawing while in contact. The challenge was to protect the forward platoons as they withdrew from being followed up by the PVA occupying the old B Company positions and from D Company's position after they broke contact. The 3 RAR would also have to clear the withdrawal route of any blocking forces, while at the same time, the evacuation of a large number of wounded and PVA prisoners would hamper their movement. As such, the timing of the withdrawal would be critical to its success. Consequently, the lead company would not move until mid-afternoon so that the rearguard would be able to use the protection of darkness to break contact, while at the same time offering good observation and fields of fire during the daylight to support the initial moves. Orders were delivered at 14:30. B Company would lead the withdrawal down the ridge line, carrying any wounded that still required evacuation, as well as clearing the route and securing the ford near the Middlesex position. C Company would wait for the artillery to neutralise the PVA on the old B Company position, before moving to establish a blocking position behind D Company. A Company would then withdraw to a blocking position behind C Company, in order to allow Gravener and Saunders to establish a clean break. Finally, D Company would withdraw through both C and A Company and set up a blocking position to delay any follow up and allow those companies to withdraw.

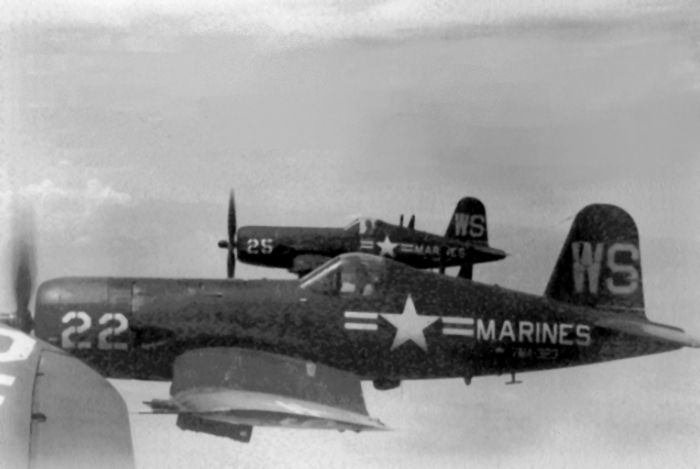
US Marine Corps Vought Corsairs over Korea, 1953

After 15:00, an airstrike was called in to dislodge the surviving PVA in front of D Company. However, the attack by two US Marine Corps F4U Corsairs was mistakenly directed at D Company themselves after their positions were wrongly marked by the spotter plane. Two men were killed and several badly burnt by napalm before the attack was broken off after the company second-in-command—Captain Michael Ryan—ran out under PVA fire waving a marker panel. The company medical orderly—Private Ronald Dunque—was subsequently awarded the Military Medal for his efforts assisting the wounded despite his own injuries. The PVA quickly attempted to exploit the chaos, moving against D Company's long exposed eastern flank. 11 Platoon on the main ridge forward of the summit was subjected to a frontal assault. However, unaffected by the napalm, they broke up the PVA attack and inflicted heavy casualties on them. Regardless, further PVA attempts to infiltrate the 3 RAR positions continued into the afternoon. (Note: Controversy surrounds the circumstances of this accident. While the Australian official historian states that Gravener requested the airstrike, it seems neither Gravener nor O'Dowd called for air support that afternoon, and it is more likely the request came from either Ferguson or Brigade Headquarters. See O'Neill 1985, p. 153 and Breen 1992, p. 97.)

The withdrawal was scheduled to begin shortly following the misdirected airstrike, and was to be preceded by an artillery bombardment with high explosive and smoke at 16:00. (Note: There is some disagreement between sources on the timing of the withdrawal, with some sources nominating 15:30, while others claim it began at 17:30. The time of 16:00 is based on an account by O'Dowd himself. See Breen 1992, p. 93.) The US tanks were subsequently moved forward to provide cover, and when 16 NZFR artillery failed to fire at the appointed hour, they provided direct fire support. Still in contact, the 3 RAR began to pull back, fighting a number of well-disciplined rearguard actions as the companies leapfrogged each other. Meanwhile, 16 NZFR kept the PVA at bay, after it finally commenced firing. B Company had taken 39 PVA prisoners during the earlier fighting, and unable to leave these behind, they were used to carry many of the 3 RAR wounded and much of their equipment as well. O'Dowd's fear that the PVA might have blocked the withdrawal route was not realised, and B Company moved back along the ridge and down to the ford without incident, reaching the Middlesex area after dark. C Company was the next to withdraw, departing at 16:30, just after suffering another casualty from sniper fire. Saunders led his company up the spur and then south down the main ridge without incident, followed by A Company during the next hour with the PVA in close pursuit.

Murdoch had been concerned lest he and his men should be engaged when they reached the Kapyong River in an exhausted condition and with little ammunition. The 3 RAR were fortunate, and due to difficulties of communication and navigation along the ridge line in the dark, elements of A Company had become separated and the last two platoons descended to the river too early to strike the ford. However, reaching a deserted part of the bank, they realised their mistake and immediately turned west again, following the river-bank to the ford. The PVA did not follow this sudden final turn and plunged on into the river, giving A Company an unexpected opportunity to break free. The pursuing PVA soldiers were subsequently detected by Stone and 2 PPCLI B Company on Hill 677 and were fired on. Fortunately for the 3 RAR, the 2 PPCLI heavy machine gun fire was accurately directed onto the PVA pursuers and did not hit them. The possibility of 2 PPCLI supporting fire had been foreseen earlier; however, problems with the radio relay between the 3 RAR and 2 PPCLI meant that there had been no guarantee that the withdrawing force would not be mistaken for PVA as they crossed the river.

Only D Company—which had been holding the summit and had withdrawn last—was heavily engaged and was unable to move at the scheduled time. The PVA launched a determined assault, preceding it with heavy machine-gun and mortar fire, before attempting to overrun the forward pits. D Company repelled the PVA assault and Gravener decided to begin to thin out his position before the situation deteriorated further. With one platoon covering their movement, D Company subsequently withdrew, closely pursued by the PVA. Finally, D Company succeeded in achieving a clean break after dark, and D Company was able to safely withdraw. By 23:30, the battalion was clear, completing its withdrawal at full speed, and suffering only minimal casualties. Regardless, the previous 24 hours of fighting had been costly for the 3 RAR, resulting in 32 killed, 59 wounded and three captured; the bulk of them in A Company and battalion headquarters. Yet, they had temporarily delayed the assault on the brigade's right flank, and had inflicted far heavier casualties on the PVA before being withdrawn. Significantly for the 3 RAR and 16 NZFR, 25 April was Anzac Day. Following their successful conquest of Hill 504, the PVA turned their attention to the encircled 2 PPCLI on the left flank.

== Canadian 2 PPCLI last stand on Hill 677, 24–25 April 1951 ==
=== Preparations ===
On 23 April, Stone, battalion commander of the 2 PPCLI, had personally reconnoitred the Kapyong battlefield and the approaches to Hill 677, discerning which routes of assault the PVA could possibly choose. Stone then directed his Pioneer Platoon to widen and reconstruct a narrow, winding trail which ascended Hill 677 on the south slopes from the village of Tungmudae. This provided Stone with an essential supply route and the ability to maneouvre 12 M3 Half-tracks carrying heavy machine guns and mortars up to the summit of Hill 677, which he then positioned adjacent to his battalion headquarters. These engineering assignments were completed just before major PVA forces arrived on the battlefield.

Now assembled on the summit of Hill 677, the 700 soldiers of 2 PPCLI spent the night of 23/24 April in their shallow pits listening to the sounds of the fighting on the 3 RAR front. However, by early morning PVA activity to encircle Hill 677 increased and, with the situation deteriorating on Hill 504 on their right flank, Stone withdrew B Company from their position on the north edge of the Hill 677 summit to strengthen this eastern flank if the 3 RAR were forced to withdraw. Under the command of Major Vince Lilley, B company subsequently moved to occupy positions east of battalion headquarters on the high ground overlooking the valley road. Stone's intuitions were proven to be sound when this position, which protected not only his 2 PPCLI battalion headquarters but the battalion's major concentrations of heavy machine guns and mortars, would prove crucial during the fierce climax of the upcoming night battle.

With increasing fears that the 3 RAR would be overcome and leave his right flank exposed to attack, Stone had redeployed B Company to cover the area overlooking the valley of the Kapyong. B Company, 2 PPCLI completed its redeployment by 11:00, just in time. However, a company of American tanks from US 72nd Tank Battalion supporting 3 RAR noticed the B Company adjustment and mistook the movement for enemy troops. The US tanks opened fire on the 2 PPCLI, wounding one man, and then continued their retreat from the battlefield. The 2 PPCLI battalion now occupied a northward-facing arc curving from the summit of Hill 677 in the west to the high ground on the east closest to the river. D Company defended the left flank of the battalion, removed at a substantial distance from the main positions of 2 PPCLI which were over on the battalion's centre and right, C Company the central forward slope, while A and B Company held the right flank. The high grass and severe terrain of Hill 677 limited the ability of each company to provide mutual support. At the same time, the numerous ravines on the edge of the 2,000 feet (610 m) high hill afforded the attacking forces hidden avenues of approach to the summit of Hill 677 to within a short distance of the 2 PPCLI positions.

During the retreat of 3 RAR from Hill 504, Stone ordered 2 PPCLI B Company to provide covering fire to assist the 3 RAR escape on the run, clearly visible from Hill 677. With the PVA chasing the 3 RAR in fast pursuit, B Company opened continuous heavy machine gun fire for about a ten-minute period, exacting heavy PVA losses and enabling the 3 RAR to make good their escape. O'Dowd, the 3 RAR field commander, requested an end to the supporting fire, fearful of the possibility of unintended 3 RAR casualties.

Stone would later complain of the sudden disappearance of the US artillery support, "when the battle got hot on the Australian front, the Forward Observation Officer for the US mortars on my front walked out and never a pop did we get from his company." The two US artillery companies had fled on foot, leaving their mortars, guns, supplies, and 50 loaded trucks plus other vehicles behind on the battlefield. The two US mortar and howitzer companies hastily fled on foot, the mortarmen hiked and traversed 10 mi (16 km) to the east before resting, apparently convinced that a major PVA breakthrough was imminent at Kapyong. Stone later bitterly observed that among some of the UN forces, "bug-outs were the accepted manner of withdrawing." With the departure of the US tanks and artillery support and the forced retreat of the 3 RAR battalion, Stone's command was now surrounded and cut off from their possible supply routes and would be reliant upon existing supplies and ammunition. Each of the four 2 PPCLI companies was allocated two Vickers medium machine guns, as well as three 60 mm (2.4 in) mortars. Defensive fire tasks were registered, while additional ammunition was pushed out to the forward companies in the afternoon.

As darkness descended on 24 April, Burke decided not to utilize radio contacts with 2 PPCLI headquarters on the summit of Hill 677. Burke ordered a Dakota aircraft equipped with loudspeakers and personally flew over the 2 PPCLI positions on Hill 677. He announced to the soldiers below that they were now on their own, cut off from any support and would have to fight the coming battle alone. He wished them good luck and encouraged them to fight bravely. He then flew back to Brigade HQ, amidst derisive response from the unsettled soldiers. Burke's brief appearance over the battlefield served to cause further apprehension among the 2 PPCLI. Many of the less experienced 2 PPCLI soldiers voiced a desire to run and abandon the position. Veteran war hero Tommy Prince played a central role in steadying and motivating the frightened men. Stone and 2 PPCLI could no longer expect that 27th Brigade HQ forces would continue to engage the enemy or would assemble a relief column to break through the PVA stranglehold on the supply road at Tungmudae. Stone was never in any doubt as to the essential strategic significance of Hill 677 for the UN forces and he issued a straightforward order to his battalion on the battalion radio sets, "We're surrounded. We'll hold this position until we're relieved." "No retreat, no surrender."

=== Night battle ===
To prepare and plan their initial assaults on Hill 677, the PVA command were not able to pinpoint the 2 PPCLI defensive positions, having had no opportunity to carry out a thorough reconnaissance prior to the attack. However, the severe terrain and numerous ravines on the sides of Hill 677 provided the PVA with hidden access routes to the summit near the 2 PPCLI positions where the PVA formations would gather. The PVA formations were visible during the final mass assaults against the 2 PPCLI entrenchments. In the darkness, the 2 PPCLI rifle fire would prove to be ineffective, forcing them to resort to using large amounts of grenades followed by bayonets in hand-to-hand combat. The front lines of PVA attackers were all equipped with light machine guns, which, in close quarters fighting, were markedly superior to the 2 PPCLI Lee-Enfield Mark III single-shot manual bolt-action rifles. Canadian Army command policy was lenient to allowing personal arms and a few 2 PPCLI soldiers possessed privately acquired Bren guns of their own to provide close quarters machine gun capability, and this factor would be crucial in the outcome of the Company B defence of battalion HQ and main artillery positions.

The PVA mortars and artillery were largely ineffective in the first assaults, and very few rounds fell on the 2 PPCLI positions during the initial assaults of the evening. However, in the later climactic mass attacks against Company D, the PVA artillery and mortars were important in leading the assaults, then being directed with accurate observer information from the summit. In their haste to follow up the collapse of the ROK 6th Division, the PVA 118th and 60th Divisions had left the bulk of their slow-moving heavy artillery and supplies well to the north.

Having dislodged the defenders from Hill 504, the PVA 60th Division and 118th Division would attempt to capture the dominating heights of Hill 677 held by the 2 PPCLI. The PVA had earlier detected the redeployment of B Company, 2 PPCLI and at 22:00 that evening, they commenced an assault on the defenders' right flank, the first of four attacks directed at 6 Platoon of B Company. Although the initial moves were beaten back by medium machine gun fire and mortars, a second PVA assault an hour later succeeded in overrunning the right forward section of 6 Platoon. The platoon successfully withdrew in small groups back to the company main defensive position, where they eventually halted the PVA advance. In this first wave of mass assaults of the PVA, the 2 PPCLI 60 mm (2.4 in) mortars had proven vital, their stability allowing for rapid fire out to 1,800 m (2,000 yd) with an ability to accurately hit narrow ridgelines at maximum range. The PVA had telegraphed their intentions prior to the assault by using tracer fire for direction, and had used bugles to co-ordinate troops in their forming up positions. Such inflexibility had allowed the 2 PPCLI to co-ordinate indirect fires and took a heavy toll on the attackers in the forming up positions.

During the successive attacks on 6 Platoon of B Company, Private W. R. Mitchell became prominent. Mitchell possessed his own Bren gun with which he launched single-handed counter-attacks against PVA formations, firing on the run and dispersing the enemy, thereby rescuing 6 Platoon sections which had been cut off. Despite being twice wounded by PVA shrapnel and a bullet, he persisted with his personal Bren gun forays, and later refused to leave combat for medical treatment, remaining in his position throughout the night. By the morning, he could barely stand for loss of blood. Mitchell was awarded the Distinguished Conduct Medal. The next morning, 51 PVA dead were counted around the B Company perimeter.

At about 24:00, 6 Platoon headquarters and the remaining sections ran out of ammunition and were ordered to fix bayonets and defend their positions. One of the 6 Platoon sergeants during the thick of the action "hurled his bayoneted rifle like a spear when his ammunition gave out."

Canadian M3 Half-tracks during the Korean War

Meanwhile, Lt. Hub Gray of B Company detected a full battalion sized PVA force of about 500 men climbing silently through the ravine access south of the B Company position. This force assembled quietly without the usual PVA bugle and sound signals, and then moved en masse toward Stone's battalion headquarters, apparently according to a preconceived plan of attack. Lilley of B Company warned Stone of the impending assault, and Stone himself assumed command of the HQ combat forces for this engagement. Twelve M3 Half-tracks from Mortar Platoon had already been positioned there by Stone before the battle, each armed with a .50-calibre and a .30-calibre Browning machine gun. Stone held fire until the PVA broke through the tree-line and advanced to just 40 m (44 yd) from their front. The assembled defenders opened fire with machine guns and with mortars at their minimum engagement distance. The PVA suffered severe casualties and the assault was beaten off. During the height of this battle for the 2 PPCLI HQ, the rear platoon of A Company to the north of B Company opened fire with their Vickers medium machine guns in support of Stone's position. Stone contacted the A Company second-in-command and rejoined, "Stop your firing...we can take care of ourselves. Save your ammunition, you're going to need it." The PVA's next plan of attack would focus on areas where the 2 PPCLI heavy machine guns were not a factor in defence.

Shortly after the second major assault on B Company was repelled, another large PVA assault force was detected fording the Kapyong Valley river in the bright moonlight, some 2000 feet beneath the Kapyong summit height and about 800 metres distant. The 2 PPCLI .50 calibre heavy machine guns were concentrated on this body of soldiers, and 71 bodies were counted on the banks of the river the following day.

The PVA now turned their attention to D Company, holding a portion of the summit of Hill 677, separated from the bulk of 2 PPCLI by a long distance of about one mile on the battalion's left flank and beyond the range of the concentrated group of 2 PPCLI medium and heavy machine gun defensive fire. PVA success on this flank was intended to provide a spacious staging area to assemble an overwhelmingly large force for a final assault against the 2 PPCLI battalion HQ and principal machine gun/mortar positions. At 01:10, a large PVA force was detected forming up on a spur to the west towards Hill 865 and they were engaged by defensive fire. The huge PVA formation assaulted 10 Platoon of D Company, commanded by Lt. Michael George Levy, with supporting fire from PVA medium machine-guns and artillery now directed and employed to better effect than previously. The PVA attackers were soon effectively engaged by Vickers machine guns from 12 Platoon firing in mutual support. Switching their axis of assault to 12 Platoon, the PVA succeeded in overrunning one of the 12 Platoon sections and a medium machine gun, killing two of its crew who had remained at their post firing until they were overcome. However, the attackers made no attempt to use the Vickers gun for their own advantage or to disable or damage the weapon. With the supporting artillery of 16 NZFR's guns now fully engaged, firing at the 'very slow' rate to conserve ammunition, the weight of the PVA assaults soon prompted Stone to request it be increased to the 'slow' rate of two rounds per gun per minute, so that 24 rounds fell every 30 seconds within a target area of 180 m (200 yd).

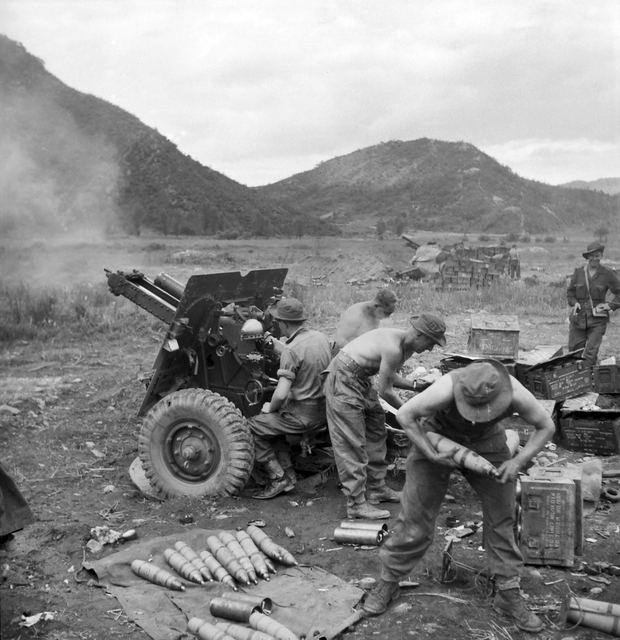
New Zealand gunners firing a 25-pounder in Korea

Despite the determined resistance from D Company, the PVA attack succeeded in infiltrating the D Company perimeter through the gaps between platoons, and D Company was surrounded on three sides. The forward platoons of D company were completely overrun by PVA infantry. The company commander, Captain J.G.W. Mills, acting on a request from 10 Platoon leader Levy, in turn requested from Stone a supporting artillery barrage on three separate occasions targeted directly onto Levy's position. Levy had commanded his men to seek whatever cover they could in the shallow trenches which had been scraped out of the rocky ground. Stone approved the request, after first asking Mills, "Do you know what you are asking?", and receiving an affirmative response. Stone then immediately contacted 16 NZFR HQ and arranged for barrages of shrapnel shells from 16 NZFR's guns, now located some 4.5 mi (7.2 km) distant. The barrages onto Levy's platoon occurred on the three occasions during the early morning of 25 April after 10 Platoon was overrun by PVA mass attacks, each barrage consisting of about 15 to 20 minutes duration. The shrapnel shells were fused to explode several metres or yards above ground. This tactic succeeded and the massed PVA soldiers were devastated by the shrapnel fire. D Company in their dug-out holes escaped largely unharmed by the shrapnel shells, with a small number of shrapnel casualties but no fatal wounds. The shrapnel shells fell within 20 feet (6.1 m) of the 2 PPCLI slit trenches, but there were no direct hits on any of the trenches. The number of PVA soldiers killed by the artillery barrages directed on the mass PVA attacks against D Company was estimated at 4,000. 16 NZFR and their 25-pound guns fired an estimated 10,000 rounds in the course of the night battle in support of D Company. The PVA persisted, however, launching a number of smaller attacks against D company during the rest of the night, but these were again repulsed by artillery and small arms fire.

By dawn, the attacks on the 2 PPCLI positions had abated, and with D Company remaining in control of the left flank, they were able to recover the previously abandoned machine gun at first light in daring fashion. Private Kenneth Barwise, who had personally killed six enemy soldiers while carrying ammunition resupply during the mass assaults on D Company, now ran down through no-man's-land to the abandoned Vickers medium machine gun. After exchanging fire with nearby PVA forces, he snatched the heavy load in his arms and raced back to his own lines while in full view of the enemy. Barwise was awarded the Military Medal for his deeds. Meanwhile, on the right flank, B Company was able to re-occupy the platoon position it had been forced to relinquish earlier the previous evening. The PVA had suffered enormous casualties during the night assaults, with perhaps 300 or even more than 1,000 killed by the 2 PPCLI, and there were also a great many more killed by the heavy artillery barrages from 16 NZFR. The PVA, following their usual procedure, had removed most of their battlefield dead during the night, and 2 PPCLI soldiers did not venture out to count the dead until after the battle. Gray found the bodies of a 2 PPCLI corporal and his PVA opponent lying together after a bayonet combat, mute testimony to the intensity of the fighting. However, with the 2 PPCLI now completely exhausted of its ammunition and medical and food supplies, another full-scale PVA assault during that night would have been difficult for the 2 PPCLI to resist. Fortunately for the 2 PPCLI, such an assault did not materialize.

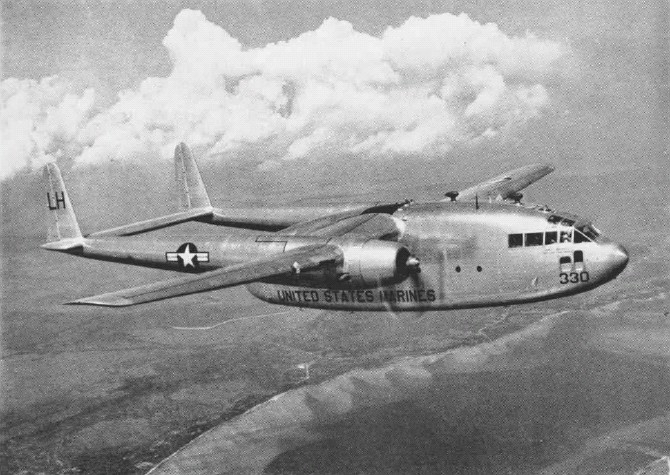
A C-119, similar to those used at Kapyong

=== Further 2 PPCLI operations ===
Although the PVA continued to mount small attacks, 2 PPCLI were now in control of the summit. Following the retreat of the 3 RAR battalion on the previous day, the PVA had established blocking positions on the supply road from the rear slope of Hill 677 to the village of Tungmudae. This was the trail which had been improved by Stone on 23 April just prior to the PVA assaults. PVA control of the rear slopes of Hill 677 had cut the 2 PPCLI off from resupply and prevented any form of military reinforcements or relief from reaching them. Anticipating that the battle would continue into the evening of the 25th or be renewed with intensity by another major assault by the PVA 118th and 60th Division forces, Stone made a request at 04:00 that food, ammunition, and water be airdropped directly onto Hill 677 and by 10:00 the required supplies—including 81 mm (3.2 in) mortar ammunition—were dropped by four American C-119 Flying Boxcars flying from an airbase in Japan. During the air drop, only four parachutes landed in PVA controlled areas with the remainder successfully recovered by 2 PPCLI.

The 2 PPCLI continued to improve their defensive position and trenches. The Middlesex from the reserve positions deployed in front of 27th Brigade HQ sent out patrols during the morning in order to reconnoitre the PVA forces that had occupied the rear areas behind Hill 677 and surrounded the 2 PPCLI positions during the previous day. It was not until 14:00 on 25 April that patrols from B Company, 2 PPCLI reported that the supply trail was now clear, and that the PVA 118th and 60th Divisions had apparently withdrawn to the north. Stone subsequently requested that further supplies be sent forward by vehicle as rapidly as feasible while the supply route through Tungmudae remained open, and before the PVA divisions could return. Having left their supplies of food and ammunition far behind during the advance two days earlier, the PVA 118th and 60th Divisions had largely withdrawn back up the Kapyong Valley in the late afternoon of 25 April in order to regroup and replenish following the extremely heavy casualties incurred during the fighting. The principal PVA formations had thus retreated prior to any UN relief forces reaching the 2 PPCLI positions, fulfilling the grim assessment given by Burke to the encircled 2 PPCLI when he flew over them on the evening of 24 April.

The remainder of 25 April was relatively quiet for 2 PPCLI, although they were subjected to periodic harassing fire from the PVA. D Company received heavy machine-gun fire from Hill 865 to the west, in particular. Regardless, the PVA made no further attempts to attack, and confined themselves to limited patrolling activities across the front.

Burke had already been removed from command on the morning of 25 April and replaced by Brigadier George Taylor, a senior officer who had served with great distinction in WWII. Taylor then ordered the US 5th Cavalry Regiment to launch an assault to recover Hill 504 on the afternoon of 25 April which resulted in substantial US casualties. The remaining PVA soldiers on that hill position offered some resistance until about 16:00.

The following day on 26 April the 2 PPCLI, now replenished with ammunition and other supplies, launched an assault against the remaining PVA entrenched on the northern slopes of Hill 677. Several PVA concentrations were broken up by heavy artillery fire and airstrikes. The 2 PPCLI were finally relieved on Hill 677 by a battalion of the 5th Cavalry Regiment on the evening of 26 April. US patrols north of the feature met no resistance, while the US forces were also able to patrol east along Route 17 to Chunchon without contacting the PVA. By last light on 27 April, the situation had been stabilised on the Kapyong Valley front. The 2 PPCLI now formed the rear guard of the 27th Brigade as they moved out of the Kapyong sector towards the Seoul region of the UN front on 28 April. This rear guard was given the sobriquet of "the Stone force", after their commander.

Stone himself offered an assessment of the lesson emerging from the Battle of Kapyong, "Kapyong demonstrated that morale, spirit of the troops, is probably the most important factor in battle." At the 2 PPCLI last stand at Hill 677, in addition to the five high level medals awarded, there were eleven Mentioned in Dispatches, indicating a widespread combat response from the 2 PPCLI. Most importantly, Stone had devised, and had insisted upon over the objections of his superior generals, a rigorous six-week training course in mountain combat at the Miryang mountains in southern South Korea immediately prior to assignment with 27th Brigade in February, which prepared his men for the confused and isolated night combats at Kapyong. Stone's final assessment of his battalion's performance at Kapyong was that "with [UN] units buckling all around them, the Patricia's did not give up an inch of ground." Stone claimed, "The front broke everywhere and we were the only battalion holding in the whole of Korea on our side at the time."

== Aftermath ==
=== Summary and casualties ===
With vastly superior numbers, the PVA had attacked on a broad front, and had overrun a number of the UN positions. After a fierce fire-fight the PVA had pushed the ROK 6th Division, 3 RAR and US tank and artillery forces at Kapyong. In addition, five companies (two US mortar and howitzer companies, two companies of the US 74th Engineer Combat Battalion and a company of the Middlesex) had fled the battlefield by foot east to Chunchon in anticipation of a PVA breakthrough. All of these UN units withdrew from combat into a reserve position, and did not engage the PVA further in the battle. The 2 PPCLI, supported by long distance artillery fire from 16 NZFR managed to survive a two-day encirclement and resisted full assaults by the PVA 118th and 60th Divisions, causing the PVA to substantially withdraw before the arrival of UN relief forces. The UN forces ultimately prevailed, albeit through a last stand by the 2 PPCLI, despite being outnumbered on the field of battle by a factor of greater than ten to one.

Indeed, despite their numerical advantage and possession of light machine guns, which gave the PVA the advantage in small arms fire, the PVA had been outgunned in heavy artillery capacity. This edge in artillery fire allowed the 2 PPCLI to survive and succeed at Kapyong. Despite their eventual defeat, the battle once again demonstrated that the PVA were tough and skillful soldiers capable of inflicting heavy casualties on the 3 RAR and US tanks, and forcing their retreat off the battlefield.

As a result of the fighting, 3 RAR losses were 32 killed (two by friendly fire from the US air strike), 59 wounded and three captured, while 2 PPCLI casualties included 10 killed and 23 wounded, apparently on 25 April, later amended to 12 killed and 35 wounded (one by friendly fire from US tanks, several by friendly fire from 16 NZFR), or 18 killed and 38 wounded (including both days of 24 and 25 April). US casualties included three men killed, 12 wounded, and two tanks destroyed, all from A Company, 72nd Heavy Tank Battalion. 16 NZFR lost two killed and five wounded. The US 5th Cavalry Regiment suffered 10 killed and more wounded on 25 and 26 April at Hill 504 and other locations at Kapyong. Total UN casualties in the Battle of Kapyong were 65 killed and more than 114 wounded.

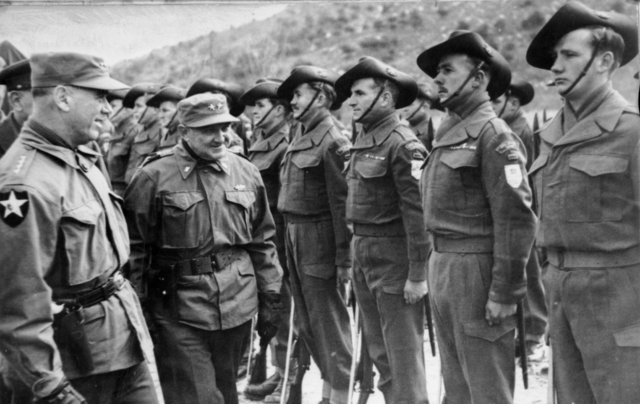
General James Van Fleet inspects members of 3 RAR after awarding a Presidential Unit Citation to the Battalion in December 1951

In contrast, the PVA losses were far heavier, and may have included approximately 6,000 killed and many more wounded.

In the battle at Hill 677, there were no reports of any 2 PPCLI soldier surrendering or being taken captive, nor of any PVA soldiers surrendering or being taken captive.

=== Awards ===
2 PPCLI, 3 RAR and A Company, US 72nd Heavy Tank Battalion were all subsequently awarded the US Presidential Unit Citation in June 1951 for their actions during the battle. 16 NZFR, without whom the 3 RAR and 2 PPCLI might have suffered a fate of annihilation, were awarded the South Korean Presidential Unit Citation in November 1951. Although the 2 PPCLI and 3 RAR had borne the brunt of the fighting, the Middlesex had also been briefly engaged in action early in the battle, but were not awarded the Presidential Unit Citation.

Burke, who commanded the 27th Brigade at Kapyong, was not given any award for the battle, having withdrawn his Brigade forces into a reserve position during the battle, leaving the 2 PPCLI isolated and under Burke's direct orders to make a last stand and fight to the death. Burke was summarily removed from command on the morning of 25 April while the battle was in progress and was immediately transported to Hong Kong. He was later assigned to Malaya.

Stone was not nominated by Burke for an award for the battle. However eight months later, in December 1951, Stone was nominated by Brigadier Rockingham for his third Distinguished Service Order for Stone's period of command of 2 PPCLI throughout the year of 1951, and the award was made in February 1952. Stone had remained in the front line of combat leading his men, which was a necessary requirement for the DSO award. Stone's insistence on creating a special mountain combat training course in Korea for the 2 PPCLI just prior to assignment with 27th Brigade in February, obtained by Stone over the objections of the U.S. generals commanding U.S. Eighth Army, was vindicated, and Stone's previous experiences with mountain battles in Italy were employed to construct the 2 PPCLI defensive arrangements at Kapyong. In December 2016, Stone was posthumously (Stone died in 2005) designated as an official Korean War Hero by the Government of South Korea Ministry of Patriots and Veterans Affairs. The citation stated that the 2 PPCLI battalion had "achieved a milestone victory when they won the Battle of Gapyeong (Kapyong) against formidable attacks from Chinese troops" and that "with their victory in the Battle of Gapyeong (Kapyong), Stone and his soldiers are remembered as the Legends of Gapyeong to this day."

Mills, commander of D Company of 2 PPCLI, was nominated by Stone and awarded the Military Cross for endorsing and forwarding 10 Platoon commander Levy's requests for artillery fire to be directed upon Levy's own position, an act which may have been responsible for the 2 PPCLI survival and success at Kapyong. However, unknown to Stone, Mills was not present in the actual battle area, but was a substantial distance away behind a protective ridge. He was reliant upon the judgment and directions from Levy, who was active in the trenches directing the D Company platoons and calling in the artillery strikes locations through Mills.

Levy himself was not awarded a medal, which later became a point of controversy. However, in 2004 the Governor General of Canada awarded Levy an official grant of arms, flag and badge, with a personal coat of arms in recognition of his central role in the battle. In 2017, Levy was posthumously (Levy died in 2007) awarded the Ambassador of Peace Medal by the South Korean government. Following Kapyong, Stone appointed Levy to be his Chief Intelligence Officer for the battalion.

Ferguson was nominated by Burke and awarded the DSO. Burke claimed that Ferguson had displayed bravery under fire. Ferguson did not nominate O'Dowd for an award. O'Dowd had assumed field command of the battalion and had designed and executed the 3 RAR escape. Ferguson was removed from command in July and was assigned to training duties in Australia.

Koch was awarded both the American Distinguished Service Cross and the British Military Cross for the essential role his tanks had played in the fighting around Hill 504.

The Royal Australian Regiment, Princess Patricia's Canadian Light Infantry and the Middlesex Regiment were subsequently granted the battle honour "Kapyong". Today, the battle is regarded as the most famous action fought by the Canadian and Australian armies in Korea, and the most famous action fought by the Canadian Armed Forces since WWII. On the battlefield itself, a major park and memorial to the Canadian Army was built and dedicated in 1983, the (Kapyong) Gapyeong Canada Monument. There is also a major park and monument dedicated to the Australian Army participation in the battle, 1.3 kilometres distant from the Canadian monument in the same area.

=== Subsequent operations ===
By 29 April, the PVA Spring Offensive was halted by UN forces at a defensive line north of Seoul, known as the No-Name Line. In total, it was a withdrawal of 56 km (35 mi) in the US I and IX Corps sectors, and 32 km (20 mi) in the US X Corps and ROK III Corps sectors. Although the main blow had fallen on US I Corps, the resistance by British Commonwealth forces in the battles at the Imjin River and at Kapyong had helped to blunt its impetus and prevented a potential encirclement of the U.S. forces in Korea, which were then in full retreat across the Korean front lines. The defence mounted by the 27th Brigade stopped the PVA from isolating US I Corps from US IX Corps, and prevented a potential surrounding of the UN forces. This also halted the PVA advance on Seoul and prevented its capture. The PVA had now experienced a notable reduction of their initial tactical resources of men and material for the offensive, and were extending their supply lines. Some PVA soldiers were now tired, hungry, and short of equipment and during the fighting at Hill 504 they had demonstrated a greater willingness to surrender than in previous encounters, with 3 RAR taking 39 prisoners, only eight of them wounded. There were no reports of PVA soldiers surrendering or being taken captive in the battle at Hill 677. Contingent on the rapid attainment of its objectives, the attempted PVA coup de main ultimately failed amid heavy casualties and they abandoned their attacks against US I and IX Corps. The PVA had suffered at least 30,000 casualties during the period 22–29 April. In contrast, US casualties during the same period numbered 314 killed and 1,600 wounded, while Commonwealth, ROK and other UN contingents brought the total to 547 killed, 2,024 wounded and 2,170 captured, the disparity highlighting the devastating effect of UN artillery firepower against massed infantry. Undeterred by these setbacks, the Second Phase of the Spring Offensive began on 16 May to the east of Kapyong, which ended at the Battle of the Soyang River.

27th Brigade was reformed and renamed as the 28th British Commonwealth Brigade. Burke was removed from command during the battle, with Brigadier George Taylor taking over command of the new formation on 25 April. The new Commonwealth formation was pulled back into IX Corps reserve to the southwest of Kapyong, near the junction of the Pukhan and Chojon rivers, with the 2 PPCLI forming the rearguard of the manoeuvre. 3 RAR was transferred to 28th Brigade, while the 1st Battalion, The King's Own Scottish Borderers and the 1st Battalion, The King's Shropshire Light Infantry replaced the Argylls and Middlesex regiments. Later, 2 PPCLI was transferred to the newly arrived 25th Canadian Infantry Brigade on 27 May. After protracted negotiations between the governments of Australia, Britain, Canada, India, New Zealand and South Africa, an agreement had been reached to establish an integrated formation with the aim of increasing the political significance of their contribution, as well as facilitating the solution of the logistic and operational problems faced by the various Commonwealth contingents. The 1st Commonwealth Division was formed on 28 July 1951, with the division including the 25th Canadian, 28th British Commonwealth, and 29th British Infantry Brigades under the command of Major General James Cassels, and was attached to US I Corps.

For many of the 3 RAR, Kapyong was to be their last major battle before completing their period of duty and being replaced, having endured much hard fighting, appalling weather, and the chaos and confusion of a campaign that had ranged up and down the length of the Korean Peninsula. Most had served in the Second Australian Imperial Force (2nd AIF) during WWII and this combat experience had proven vital. Regardless, casualties had been heavy, and since the battalion's arrival from Japan in September 1950, the 3 RAR had lost 87 killed, 291 wounded and five captured.

Both 3 RAR and 2 PPCLI would participate in Operation Commando and the First Battle of Maryang-san at Hill 355 in October 1951 which defined the final battle lines north of Seoul in that sector for the remainder of the Korean War. The 2 PPCLI launched an offensive drive which gained control of the Jamestown Line on 4 October 1951. Stone and 2 PPCLI would repel a large attacking force of the PVA of more than one battalion on 12 October. In December 1951, the annual enlistments for 2 PPCLI expired and most of the soldiers were discharged from the Canadian Army. In early 1952, Stone would recruit new men to form and train 2 PPCLI as an elite special operations unit and parachute battalion.

== See also ==
- List of last stands
- Military victories against the odds
- Gapyeong Canada Monument
- Kapyong (2011) – documentary about the battle
- United Nations Memorial Cemetery, Busan, South Korea – where many of the Australian and Canadian casualties are buried
