= Hub Gray =

Canadian military officer and author

Hubert Archibald "Hub" Gray (1928 – 9 November 2018) was a Canadian military officer and author.

Gray enlisted with the Canadian Scottish Regiment as an officer candidate after the Second World War. During the Korean War he served as a lieutenant with the Second Battalion, Princess Patricia's Canadian Light Infantry (PPCLI). He led a mortar platoon in the Battle of Kapyong.

In 2003 Gray published a memoir on the Korean War, Beyond the Danger Close.
