= Maehwasan (Gangwon) =

South Korean mountain

Coordinates: 37°01′N 127°27′E

Highest point
- Elevation: 1,085 m (3,560 ft)

Geography
- Location: South Korea

Korean name
- Hangul: 매화산
- Hanja: 梅花山
- RR: Maehwasan
- MR: Maehwasan

Maehwasan (Korean: 매화산) is a South Korean mountain between Hoengseong County and Wonju, Gangwon Province. It has an elevation of 1,085 m (3,560 ft).

== See also ==
- List of mountains in Korea
- Battle of Maehwa-san
