= Bruce Ferguson (Australian Army officer) =

Australian Army officer

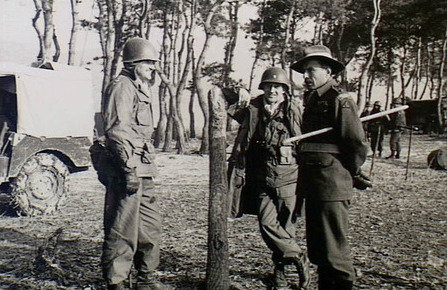
- Ferguson (right) with two US Army officers during the Korean War
- Born: 13 April 1917; Wellington, New Zealand
- Died: 21 December 1988 (aged 71); Canberra, Australia
- Military career
- Allegiance: Australia
- Branch: Australian Army
- Service years: 1939–1967
- Rank: Colonel
- Commands: 13th National Service Training Battalion; 1st Battalion, Royal Australian Regiment; 3rd Battalion, Royal Australian Regiment
- Conflicts: Second World War; North African Campaign; Battle of Bardia; South West Pacific; Kokoda Track campaign; Korean War; Battle of Chongju; Battle of Kapyong
- Awards: Distinguished Service Order; Military Cross; Mentioned in Despatches

Colonel Ian Bruce Ferguson, DSO, MC (13 April 1917 – 21 December 1988) was an officer in the Australian Army who served in the Second World War and Korean War.

== Early life ==
Ferguson was born on 13 April 1917 in Wellington, New Zealand, the only child of D'Arcy Stuart Ferguson and Ethel May, née Rattray. His parents divorced and he lived with his mother. His mother later married Sydney Wren, who worked for Reuters. His education was varied as he travelled with his mother and step father, attending schools in Wellington, Melbourne, London, Paris and Dunedin. After completing his education, he working as a cadet journalist in Wellington. Upon the declaration of the Second World War, he was working with the newspaper the Sydney Sun.

== Second World War ==
Enlisting in the Second Australian Imperial Force on 3 November 1939, Ferguson was allotted to the 2/1st Battalion. Identified for his potential, he was transferred to the intelligence section of 16th Brigade headquarters. Arriving in the Middle East in February 1940, he was promoted to sergeant and later commissioned probationary lieutenant on 27 June. As the brigade intelligence officer, he participated in the battles of Bardia and Tobruk in January 1941. He was posted to the 2/2nd Battalion in May and served with it in Egypt and Syria.

After the recall of Australian forces to help defend Australia, Ferguson was promoted to captain and took over command of B Company, 2/2nd Battalion from Major Charles Green. The battalion arrived in Australia in August 1942 and, after a period of rest, sailed to Port Moresby, arriving in September. The battalion was subsequently sent along the Kokoda Trail across the Owen Stanley Range, fighting its way to Sanananda during the Kokoda Trail campaign. Upon arrival in Sanananda in October–December, the 2/2nd Battalion could only muster eighty-eight out of 550 when placed into reserve. Ferguson spent the next nine months unable to take action with the battalion, due to contracting malaria and dengue fever. He was awarded the Military Cross for his leadership in action at Templeton's Crossing on 20 October.

Recovering from his illnesses, Ferguson was appointed liaison officer at 6th Division headquarters in September 1943 and was promoted to temporary major that month, which became substantive in May 1945. He later attended the Staff School at Cabarlah, Queensland, and after completing the course he was posted to the 1st Australian Combined Operations Section in October 1944. He was attached to the 7th Division's headquarters and helped plan the amphibious landings at Morotai and Balikpapan. Ferguson was Mentioned in Despatches for his planning.

== Interwar ==
With the cessation of hostilities in August 1945, Ferguson volunteered for service in the British Commonwealth Occupation Force in Japan, where he commanded a company of the 67th Battalion at Kaita, and later on Eta Jima island. He was appointed second-in-command of the 67th Battalion in 1947. He was later attached to the British Commonwealth Occupation Force headquarters in 1948. He married Alice Elizabeth (née Browne), a staffer of the Embassy of Canada in Tokyo, on 26 June that year.

Ferguson was instrumental in reorganising the 67th Battalion, when it was redesignated the 3rd Battalion, Royal Australian Regiment (3RAR). When 3RAR was ordered to the Republic of Korea in 1950 to join the 27th British Commonwealth Brigade as part of the United Nations effort during the Korean War, he organised the re-equipping and organisation until Lieutenant Colonel Charles Green became the commanding officer.

== Korean War ==
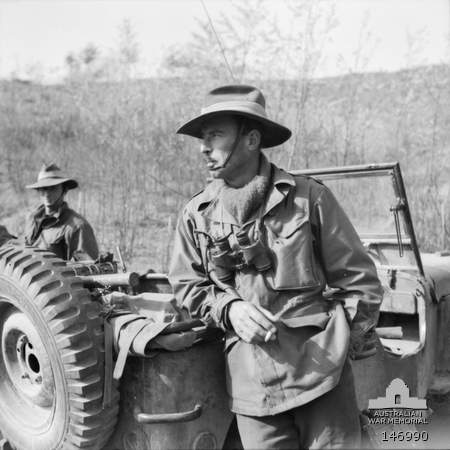
Ferguson shortly after taking command of 3RAR, near Pakchon in North Korea, 7 November 1950.

Following the death of Lieutenant Colonel Charles Green, just after the Battle of Chongju, Ferguson was promoted to temporary lieutenant colonel and appointed to command 3 RAR on 8 November 1950. While commanding 3RAR, the battalion participated in the withdrawal from North Korea to south of Seoul, suffered through the bitter winter months, the advances and attacks across the 38th parallel and the Battle of Kapyong in April 1951, where he was awarded the Distinguished Service Order and the battalion was awarded the United States Presidential Unit Citation, before withdrawal to the Han River and a further advance to the Imjin River. He was relieved of command of 3RAR on 5 July 1951 after eight months in command.

== Later life ==
After his experiences in Korea, Ferguson was appointed to command the 1st Battalion, Royal Australian Regiment, and later the 13th National Service Training Battalion from 1952 to 1953. His promotion to lieutenant colonel was made substantive in October 1957. Ferguson was an instructor from 1959 to 1962 at the Royal Military College, Duntroon in Canberra. He was assigned to the Southeast Asia Treaty Organization from 1963 to 1966 in Bangkok. He retired from the army on 14 April 1967 and was promoted the rank of colonel. After retiring from the armed forces he became secretary of the Union Club, Sydney, from 1969 to 1974.

Ferguson died on 21 December 1988 in Canberra and was survived by his wife and their three sons. According to the Australian Dictionary of Biography, he was "cremated with Anglican rites".
