= Kapyong (film) =

Kapyong is a 2011 Australian documentary film about the Battle of Kapyong, focusing on the part played by Australian troops. It was directed by Dennis K. Smith and narrated by John Waters.

It premiered on 24 April 2011, the 60th anniversary of the battle. It was launched by then Prime Minister Julia Gillard.
