= Dial-a-joke =

Telephone humor

A dial-a-joke (or a joke line) is a telephone service that users can call to listen to previously recorded jokes. Jokes are recorded on an automatic answering machine. In the past, many jokes were recorded on cassette tape and then played sequentially, each caller hearing the next joke on the tape. Modern touch tone phones allow callers to select different joke types: knock-knock, joke of the day, professional humor, random, etc.

Dial-A-Joke operators will occasionally answer calls, which is called taking a “live”. Apple co-founder Steve Wozniak met his first wife by taking a live call on his Dial-A-Joke service. He started the service as a hobby in 1973, at which time it was the first Dial-A-Joke in the San Francisco Bay Area. Wozniak's Dial-a-Joke line used an answering machine and received 2,000 calls a day during its three years of service.

== Zzzzzz ==
Zzzzzz, or simply Z, was a Dial-A-Joke line active in the 1970s. Started by Bob Bilkiss of West Los Angeles in 1970, the line was named so to appear last in the Los Angeles telephone directory. Emerging from a wave of Dial-A-Joke numbers in Los Angeles in the turn of the 1970s, Zzzzzz enjoyed a high level of popularity in its day. For several years, it was the busiest residential telephone number in the United States.

== Dial-A-Joke developed in New York City by AT&T ==
In 1974 AT&T in New York City began a one-minute Dial-a-Joke service and had Henny Youngman as their first joke teller. He told seven jokes for one message unit, and his jokes were up for the first month of New York City's Dial-a-joke service. There were 200,000 calls on the first day of the service, and 300,000 calls the second day.

Other famous comedians heard on New York City's Dial-a-joke were Morey Amsterdam, Bob Hope and Milton Berle.

== Miami's humor service ==
Miami’s Dial-a-Joke was started by nightclub owner Chuck Zissen. For the first week he not only financed the service but did the jokes live. People would call day and night for him to tell jokes, and his wife threatened to leave if things remained the same. So he changed his home telephone number, and he put the Dial-a-Joke phone line on a recorder.

== Austria ==
In Austria in the early 1960s, a joke of the week phone service was available by dialing 1562.

== See also ==
- Dial-A-Song
