= James Riley Stone =

Canadian military commander (1908–2005)

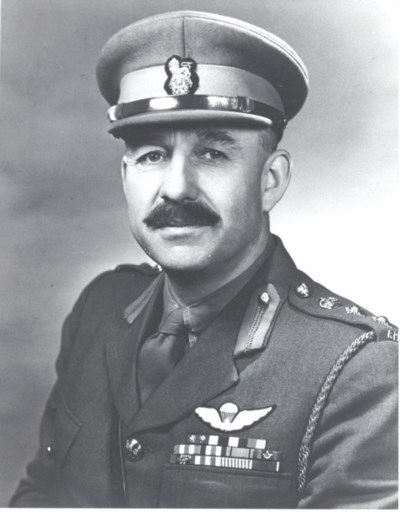
- Born: August 2, 1908; Winterbourne, Gloucestershire, UK
- Died: November 24, 2005 (aged 97); Victoria, British Columbia, Canada
- Military career
- Branch: Canadian Army
- Service years: 1939–1968
- Rank: Colonel
- Unit: The Loyal Edmonton Regiment
- Commands: The Loyal Edmonton Regiment; The Rocky Mountain Rangers; 2nd Battalion, Princess Patricia's Canadian Light Infantry; Canadian Provost Corps
- Conflicts: Second World War: Allied invasion of Sicily; Italian campaign (World War II); Netherlands campaign; Korean War: Battle of Kapyong; Operation Commando
- Awards: Military Cross (MC); Distinguished Service Order (DSO) with 2 Bars; Korean War Hero; Member of the Order of Canada (CM)

James Riley Stone CM DSO & Two Bars MC CD (2 August 1908 – 24 November 2005) was a Canadian soldier and military commander. He served in WWII and the Korean War and was awarded the Military Cross and the Distinguished Service Order with two bars. Stone was best known for leading the 2nd Battalion Princess Patricia's Canadian Light Infantry in a famous last stand at the Battle of Kapyong in the Korean conflict.

== Early years ==
Stone was born in Winterbourne, Gloucestershire. He migrated to Canada to work in the forestry, mining and cattle ranching industries.

== WWII ==
He enlisted in the Loyal Edmonton Regiment in 1939 and fought in the Second World War, rising from the rank of private to lieutenant colonel.

Major Stone won the Military Cross at the Battle of Ortona in Italy in 1943, when he single-handedly assaulted a German anti-tank gun which was blocking his company's advance, throwing a smoke grenade to disguise his attack, and then running towards and silencing it with another grenade.

As his regiment's commanding officer, he won the Distinguished Service Order at the Battle of San Fortunato in Italy in 1944, where his actions hauling heavy guns up a steep mountain caused the German Gothic Line to withdraw from a strategic position.

Stone was awarded a bar to his DSO in the Netherlands for actions against well-entrenched German forces in March 1945.

After returning to British Columbia during the post-war years, he commanded the Rocky Mountain Rangers, a unit of the Canadian Army Reserve.

== Korean War ==
During the Korean War, he commanded the 2nd Battalion, Princess Patricia's Canadian Light Infantry. He led the 700 men of this battalion in a famous last stand defending the strategic Hill 677 against the fierce assault by forces of two divisions, consisting of about 20,000 soldiers, of the Chinese People's Volunteer Army during the Battle of Kapyong in April 1951.

The UN position on Hill 677 prevented the enemy from breaking through to Seoul and potentially surrounding the US forces in Korea, which were at that time in full general retreat across the Korean front. Supporting units of the Australian Army and the US artillery had fled the battlefield, mostly without orders, leaving the 2 PPCLI encircled and depleted of ammunition. Stone ordered his men, "No retreat, no surrender", and eventually called in supporting artillery fire from 4.5 miles distant to be targeted upon the 2 PPCLI positions to devastate the mass Chinese attacks. He would receive a second bar to his DSO for his leadership in this crucial battle together with other actions in 1951.

During Operation Commando on 4 October 1951, Stone and 2 PPCLI seized the Jamestown Line north of Seoul and on 12 October repelled a large attacking force of the Chinese Army, establishing the final UN positions north of Seoul for the remainder of the Korean War.

In early 1952, Stone and 2 PPCLI were retrained as an elite special operations unit and parachute strike force, and Stone passed his parachute training. For the training assignment, Stone was appointed Chief Instructor of the Royal Canadian School of Infantry.

In December 2016, the Government of South Korea's Ministry of Patriots and Veterans Affairs designated Stone posthumously as an official Korean War Hero. The citation stated that the 2 PPCLI battalion had "achieved a milestone victory when they won the Battle of Gapyeong (Kapyong) against formidable attacks from Chinese troops" and that "with their victory in the Battle of Gapyeong (Kapyong), Stone and his soldiers are remembered as the Legends of Gapyeong to this day."

== Post war ==
After the war, while serving in Ottawa as the provost marshal in command of the Canadian Provost Corps, he founded the Military Police Fund for Blind Children.

Stone was made a Member of the Order of Canada in 1994.

== Honours and awards ==
Description	Notes
Member of the Order of Canada (CM)	
Distinguished Service Order (DSO)	With 2 Bars
Military Cross (MC)	
1939-1945 Star	
Italy Star	
France and Germany Star	
Defence Medal	
Canadian Volunteer Service Medal	With Clasp
War Medal 1939-1945	With Mentioned in Dispatches
Canadian Volunteer Service Medal for Korea	
Korean Medal	
United Nations Korea Medal	
South Korean - Korean War Hero	
Queen Elizabeth II Coronation Medal	
Canadian Centennial Medal	
Canadian Forces Decoration (CD)	With Bar

Colonel Stone Avenue in Edmonton, Alberta is named after him.

== See also ==
- List of last stands
- Military victories against the odds
