= Battle of Chongju (1950) =

Part of the Korean War

Coordinates: 39°39′N 125°20′E

- Part of the Korean War
- Green and Coad returning from a reconnaissance just east of Chongju, 29 October 1950.
Date	29–30 October 1950
Location	Chongju, North Korea
Result	United Nations victory

Belligerents
United Nations: Australia; United Kingdom; United States	North Korea

Commanders and leaders
(United Kingdom) Basil Aubrey Coad (Australia) Charles Green (DOW)	(North Korea) Unknown

Units involved
(United Kingdom) 27th Brit Com Bde: (Australia) 3 RAR; (United Kingdom) 1 ASHR; (United Kingdom) 1 MR	(North Korea) 17th Tank Bde

Strength
~200 men	~500–600 men

Casualties and losses
9 killed 30 wounded	162 killed 10 captured 11 tanks 2 self-propelled guns

The Battle of Chongju (Korean: 정주 전투, 29–30 October 1950), also spelled Battle of Jeongju took place during the United Nations Command (UN) offensive towards the Yalu River, which followed the North Korean invasion of South Korea at the start of the Korean War. The battle was fought between Australian forces from 3rd Battalion, Royal Australian Regiment (3 RAR) and the 17th Tank Brigade of the Korean People's Army (KPA) for control of Chongju, North Korea and the surrounding area. After detecting a strong KPA armoured force equipped with T-34 tanks and SU-76 self-propelled guns on a thickly wooded ridgeline astride the line of advance, the Australians launched a series of company attacks with American M4 Sherman tanks and aircraft in support. Despite heavy resistance the KPA were forced to withdraw and the Australians captured their objectives after three hours of fighting.

That evening the KPA were strongly reinforced, attacking the Australian southern flank manned by D Company 3 RAR, and partially penetrating their perimeter. After two hours of fighting the assault was repulsed, and the KPA subsequently launched a furious assault against A Company 3 RAR on the northern position, which also failed amid heavy losses. The following day the Australians advanced to the high ground overlooking Chongju, killing and capturing a number of KPA in skirmishes. That afternoon the town itself was cleared by the remaining elements of the 27th British Commonwealth Brigade without opposition. KPA casualties during the fighting were heavy, while Australian losses included their commanding officer, Lieutenant Colonel Charles Green, who was wounded in the stomach by artillery fire after the battle and died two days later.

== Background ==
=== Military situation ===
The Korean War began early in the morning of 25 June 1950, following the surprise invasion of the Republic of Korea by its northern neighbour, the communist Democratic People's Republic of Korea (DPRK). Numerically superior and better-equipped, the KPA crossed the 38th Parallel and rapidly advanced south, easily overcoming the inferior Republic of Korea Army (ROK). In response, the United Nations (UN) decided to intervene on behalf of South Korea, inviting member states to send forces to restore the situation. As a consequence, American ground forces were hastily deployed in an attempt to prevent the South Koreans from collapsing, however they too were under strength and poorly equipped, and by early August had been forced back by the KPA to an enclave around Pusan, known as the Pusan Perimeter. Key US allies—Britain, Canada and Australia—also committed forces, although these were initially limited to naval contingents and were largely viewed as token efforts in the US. Under diplomatic pressure the British agreed to deploy an infantry brigade in July, and would later dispatch a second brigade as the crisis worsened. The Canadians also agreed to provide an infantry brigade, although the first battalion would not arrive until December 1950. A total of 21 UN member states eventually contributed forces.

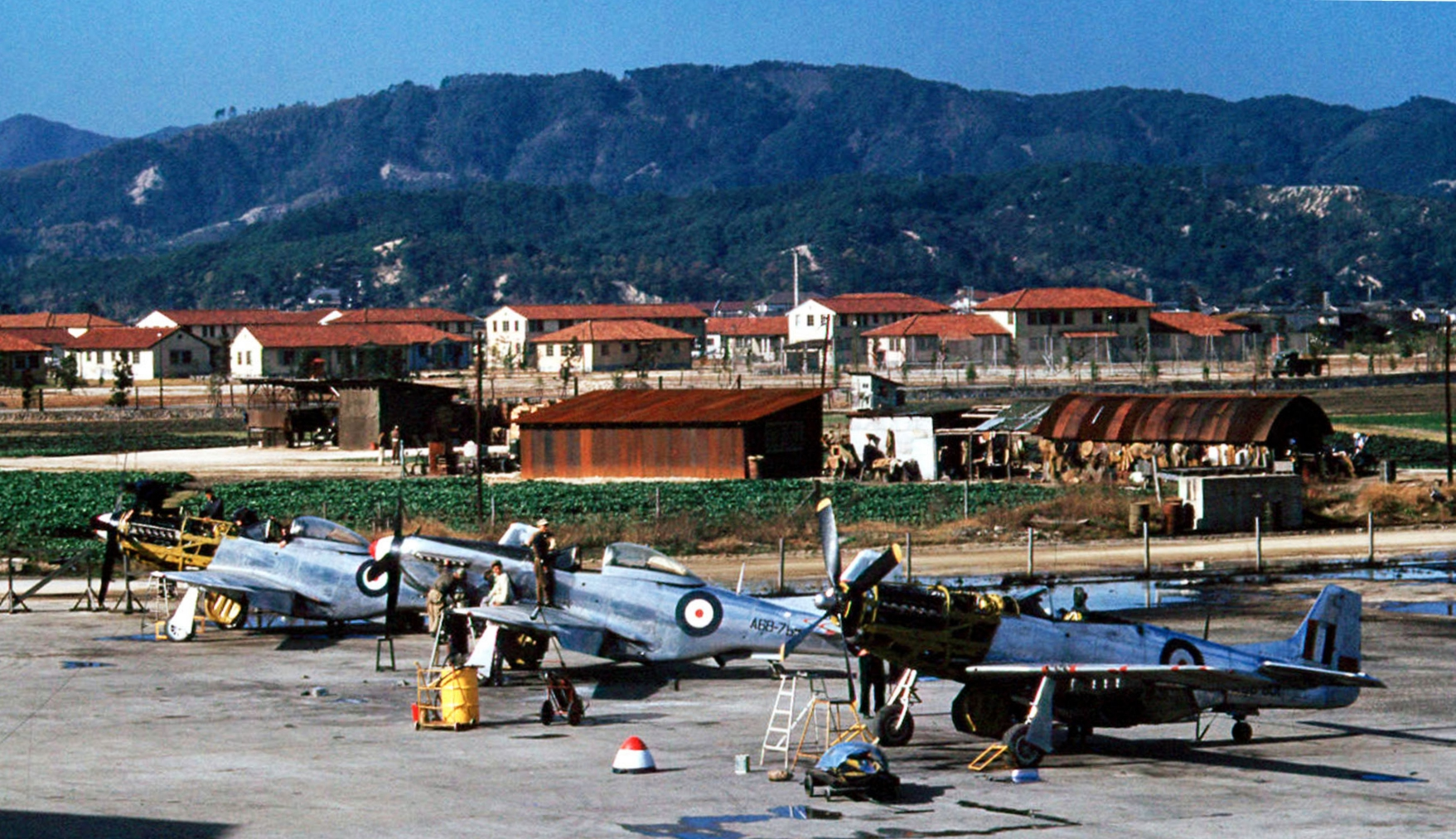
P-51 Mustang fighters from No. 77 Squadron RAAF at Iwakuni, 1950.

Australia was one of the first nations to commit units to the fighting, playing a small but sometimes significant part in the UN forces, which was initially led by General Douglas MacArthur. Forces deployed in Japan as part of the British Commonwealth Occupation Force formed the basis of the Australian response, with P-51 Mustang fighter-bombers from No. 77 Squadron RAAF flying their first missions on 2 July, while the frigate HMAS Shoalhaven and the destroyer HMAS Bataan were also committed to naval operations. During this time the 3rd Battalion, Royal Australian Regiment (3 RAR), which had been preparing to return to Australia prior to the outbreak of the war, remained in Japan, however on 26 July the Australian government announced that it would also commit the understrength and poorly equipped infantry battalion to the fighting, following a period of preparation. Training and re-equipment began immediately, while hundreds of reinforcements were hastily recruited in Australia as part of K Force; they soon began arriving to fill out the battalion. The battalion's commanding officer, Lieutenant Colonel Floyd Walsh, was subsequently replaced by Lieutenant Colonel Charles Green. An officer with extensive operational experience fighting the Japanese in New Guinea during the Second World War, Green took over from Walsh due to the latter's perceived inexperience.

On 23 September 1950, 3 RAR embarked for Korea, concentrating at Pusan on 28 September. There it joined the British 27th Infantry Brigade, a garrison formation hurriedly committed from Hong Kong by the British as the situation deteriorated around the Pusan Perimeter in late August to bolster the US Eighth Army under Lieutenant General Walton Walker. Commanded by Brigadier Basil Coad, the brigade was renamed the 27th British Commonwealth Brigade and consisted of the 1st Battalion, Argyll and Sutherland Highland Regiment (1 ASHR), the 1st Battalion, Middlesex Regiment (1 MR) and 3 RAR. Under strength, the two British battalions had each mustered just 600 men of all ranks, while the brigade was also short on transport and heavy equipment, and had no integral artillery support, for which it would rely entirely on the Americans until the 16th Field Regiment, Royal New Zealand Artillery arrived in January 1951. As such, with a strength of nearly 1,000 men, the addition of 3 RAR gave the brigade increased tactical weight as well as expediently allowing the Australians to work within a familiar organisational environment, rather than being attached to a US formation. Also under the command of the brigade were a number of US Army units, including 155 mm howitzers from the 90th Field Artillery Battalion, M4 Sherman tanks from 89th Tank Battalion and a company from the 72nd Combat Engineer Battalion.

== Prelude ==
=== Opposing forces ===
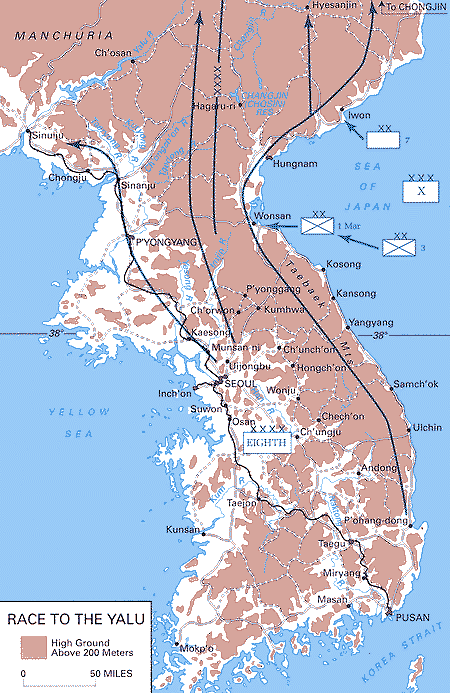
Map of the UN advance toward the Yalu River, 1950.

By the time 3 RAR arrived in the theatre, the KPA had been broken and were in rapid retreat, with MacArthur's forces conducting a successful amphibious assault at Inchon and breakout from the Pusan Perimeter on the southern tip of the Korean peninsula. A steady advance began, driving the North Koreans northwards towards the 38th Parallel. The 27th British Commonwealth Brigade was airlifted from Taegu to Kimpo Airfield north of Seoul on 5 October, however its vehicles had to move by road, driving 420 kilometres (260 mi), and did not arrive until 9 October. It was subsequently attached to the US 1st Cavalry Division, under the command of Major General Hobart R. Gay. On 16 October the brigade took over from the US 7th Cavalry Regiment as the vanguard of the UN advance into North Korea, its axis intended to take it through Kaesong, Kumchon County and Hungsu-ri to Sariwon, then through Hwangju to the North Korean capital of Pyongyang. Although the KPA had suffered heavily in the preceding weeks, they continued to resist strongly, while a lack of accurate maps and the narrowness of the roads made rapid movement difficult for the advancing UN forces. During this time 3 RAR had a platoon of American M4 Sherman tanks attached and a battery of field guns in direct support.

The 27th British Commonwealth Brigade subsequently moved 70 kilometres (43 mi) from Kumchon, with the Argylls capturing Sariwon on 17 October, killing 215 KPA and taking many prisoners for the loss of one man killed and three wounded. The brigade then passed to the command of the US 24th Infantry Division on 21 October, under the overall command of Major General John H. Church, while the US 1st Cavalry Division remained in Pyongyang to complete its capture. The 27th British Commonwealth Brigade was subsequently ordered to seize Chongju. Consequently, the brigade continued to advance north with little respite, and on 22 October the Australians fought their first major action at Yongju, killing 150 KPA and capturing 239 of the brigade's 800 prisoners, for the loss of seven men wounded. Intending to defeat the KPA and bring the war to a close, the UN forces pushed towards the Yalu River, on the Chinese border. Resistance continued to be met as the brigade crossed the Chongchon River however, and they now moved towards Pakchon. On 24 October, MacArthur had removed all restrictions on the movement of his forces south of the Yalu River and prepared for the final phase of the UN advance, defying a directive of the US Joint Chiefs of Staff and risking Chinese intervention in support of North Korea.

On the afternoon of 25 October a platoon from 3 RAR was fired on by two companies of KPA as they crossed the Taeryong River to conduct a reconnaissance of the west bank, and although they were subsequently forced to withdraw, the Australians took 10 prisoners with them. Acting as the forward elements of the brigade, that evening Green sent two companies across the river to establish defensive positions, and they subsequently broke up a frontal assault on their positions with mortars while the KPA were in the process of forming up. Sixty KPA supported by a T-34 tank then attacked the forward Australian companies at Kujin early the following morning, resulting in Australian losses of eight killed and 22 wounded. However, the KPA suffered heavy casualties including over 100 killed and 350 captured, and the Australians subsequently succeeded in defending the bridgehead after the KPA withdrew. Intelligence indicated that the British and Australians were facing the KPA 17th Tank Brigade, equipped with 20 tanks, which was preparing a last line of defence at Chongju, 70 kilometres (43 mi) away. Although the KPA had suffered heavy casualties during the previous fighting on the Taeryong River, Coad was now forced to adopt more cautious tactics, advancing in shorter bounds and clearing high points en route. (Note: Among the KPA dead was the commanding officer of the Reconnaissance Unit of the 17th Tank Brigade, Lieutenant Colonel Kim In-sik, who was carrying a number of marked maps and documents. See O'Neill 1985, p. 44.) On 27 October the Middlesex continued the advance and was involved in a sharp fight in the hills west of the river near the village of Yongsong-ni. With the war considered all but over the 27th British Commonwealth Brigade continued to pursue the KPA towards Chongju over the next three days, however the advance increasingly encountered strong resistance from KPA infantry dug-in with tanks and self-propelled guns in support, as they approached the Yalu River on the Manchurian border.

== Battle ==
=== Fighting around Chongju, 29 October 1950 ===
3 RAR took over as lead battalion of the 27th British Commonwealth Brigade on 29 October, 6 kilometres (3.7 mi) from Chongju. At 10:00 a United States Air Force (USAF) LT-6G Mosquito light spotter aircraft reported a large KPA formation consisting of a battalion-sized force of 500–600 infantry supported by several tanks and at least two self-propelled guns, positioned on a thickly wooded ridgeline around Chongju. Astride the line of the advance, these positions were noted as being well constructed, camouflaged and dug-in, with the KPA occupying positions on the forward slopes on both sides of the road. Airstrikes were called in and eight sorties were undertaken by USAF F-80 Shooting Stars which rocketed, strafed and napalmed the KPA positions on the ridgelines. By 14:00 the pilots claimed to have destroyed seven T-34 tanks and two SU-76 self-propelled guns, as well as causing many casualties among the KPA forces. These claims proved optimistic however. With only a few hours of daylight remaining, Green then planned a battalion attack with two companies forward. Under the command of Major Walter Brown, D Company was subsequently ordered to attack the KPA positions on the left of the road, followed by A Company commanded by Captain William Chitts, which would attack the right. Meanwhile, preparatory fire from the 155 mm howitzers of the 90th Field Artillery Battalion and 3-inch mortars from Support Company 3 RAR began to fall on the KPA positions.

At 14:30, D Company launched an assault against the ridge south of the road, with two platoons of Sherman tanks in support from D Company, US 89th Tank Battalion. One tank platoon led the attack followed by the other carrying infantry from 10 Platoon D Company. Under the command of Lieutenant David Mannett, 10 Platoon made a right flanking assault along the road, while 11 and 12 Platoons attacked the ridge frontally across the paddy fields. Meeting stronger resistance than expected however, the attackers came under heavy fire and one of the Sherman tanks was knocked out by an armour-piercing round that hit its turret. However, with the American tanks providing vital close support to the infantry, 10 Platoon successfully secured its objective, allowing it to take the KPA in enfilade and to provide fire support to the assault. Thus, despite strong opposition, the remainder of D Company gained the high ground by 16:30. With the earlier airstrikes having been ineffective, D Company had been opposed by a number of T-34 tanks and SU-76 self-propelled guns, however the bulk of these were destroyed by the Shermans during the assault. Another tank had been knocked out by well-directed fire at point-blank range from a Bren light machine gun by Private John Stafford, which caused the armoured vehicle's auxiliary fuel tanks to ignite, resulting in its ammunition exploding. Stafford was subsequently awarded the US Silver Star for his bravery.

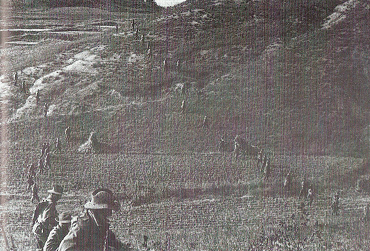
A Company 3 RAR moving in to assault Chongju.

A Company attacked the ridgeline to the north of the road to Chonju just prior to dusk, this time without the support of the Sherman tanks. The Australians again came under heavy fire from the KPA, however they quickly overcame the defenders and the ridge was secured by 17:30. During the fighting for the northern position, three KPA T-34 tanks dug-in on the ridgeline had been destroyed by the Australians at short range with M20 3.5-inch bazookas, which now proved to be effective anti-armour weapons despite difficulties experienced in their use at Kujin several days before. During the day's fighting, a total of 11 T-34 tanks and two SU-76 self-propelled guns had been destroyed by the Australian infantry and American tanks, contrary to the reports of their destruction by USAF airstrikes earlier in the day. Expecting a counter-attack, Green then ordered B Company forward to occupy positions along the road in between the positions held by D and A Companies, while Battalion headquarters moved in behind B Company, with C Company held in reserve at the rear with Support Company. After conducting a limited resupply of the forward companies, the Australians hastily began to dig in.

The KPA subsequently brought up substantial reinforcements, and soon after dark they moved against D Company on the southern flank. Preparatory fire by artillery, mortars and machine-guns began at 19:00, following which a battalion-sized ground assault was launched. The weight of the counter-attack fell on 10 Platoon D Company, with Mannett holding his platoon's fire until the KPA were only 10 metres (33 ft) away before engaging, killing 32 men. Mannett was later awarded the Military Cross for his leadership during the initial assault and the subsequent defence of the ridgeline. Regardless, the KPA succeeded in overrunning parts of the Australian position before they were finally repulsed following counter-attacks by 11 and 12 Platoons during two hours of fierce fighting. A number of KPA also succeeded in penetrating the perimeter, and they moved behind D Company from where they fired on the 3 RAR headquarters. Contact was subsequently lost with D Company and was not regained until the KPA were forced to withdraw by Headquarters Company, under Captain Ben O'Dowd, which then cleared the depth positions. At 21:30 the focus of the KPA counter-attack shifted to the northern flank, launching a heavy assault against A Company. This effort also failed however, being repulsed as Chitts called-in indirect fire from the Support Company mortars and American howitzers to within 10 metres (33 ft) of the forward Australian positions. The KPA finally withdrew at 22:15, though a SU-76 self-propelled gun continued to fire sporadically into the Australian positions until 23:00.

=== Clearance of the town, 30 October 1950 ===
The following morning the Australians remained in position, and at daybreak they found more than 150 KPA dead within the 3 RAR defensive position. Coad subsequently brought the Middlesex forward to secure his northern flank, while 3 RAR moved forward to the Talchon River, taking up positions in the hills overlooking Chongju by 11:00. During the advance the Australians had clashed with a number of KPA stragglers, killing 12 and capturing 10 in skirmishes. It became clear that organised resistance had ceased however, with the successful Australian assault and the subsequent defence of its objectives the day before breaking the KPA locally. In the north the Middlesex pushed forward to the riverbank, while in the afternoon the Argylls forded the river with two platoons of Shermans. Meanwhile, aerial reconnaissance reported the presence of KPA tanks to the west of Chongju. Regardless, that afternoon the Argylls encountered no further opposition as they entered and cleared the ruined and burning town, securing it by 17:00. The brigade then moved into divisional reserve for the US 24th Infantry Division, with Church ordering the US 21st Infantry Regiment to take its place in the lead in order to give the British and Australian infantry a much needed respite. The tanks and infantry of the 21st Infantry Regiment subsequently moved through the brigade.

The 27th British Commonwealth Brigade adopted tight security that evening due to the threat of KPA infiltration. For added protection while in reserve the 3 RAR headquarters had been sited on the reverse slope of a hill overlooking the Talchon River, with the rifle companies occupying the forward slope of the ridgeline to the west and a spur line which thrust towards the river bank. Around dusk at 18:10 on 30 October, six high-velocity shells, likely from a KPA self-propelled gun or tank, hit the area. Five of the shells landed on the forward slope, while the sixth cleared the crest and detonated to the rear of the C Company position after hitting a tree. In his tent on a stretcher after 36 hours without sleep, Green was severely wounded in the stomach by a fragment from the wayward round. He was evacuated to a Mobile Army Surgical Hospital (MASH) at Anju, however he succumbed to his wounds and died two days later on 1 November. Forty other men who had been in the vicinity when the shell landed were unhurt. A popular and respected commanding officer, Green's loss was keenly felt by the Australians. Meanwhile, Coad received congratulations from Gay for the brigade's victory at Chongju after marching 50 kilometres (31 mi) in twelve hours.

== Aftermath ==
=== Casualties ===
The fighting around Chongju was the heaviest undertaken by the Australians since entering the war. KPA casualties included 162 killed and 10 captured, while Australian losses were nine killed and 30 wounded, including Green. (Note: Green, who was awarded the Distinguished Service Order (DSO) and American Silver Star, was eventually buried at the United Nations Memorial Cemetery in Pusan, along with 281 other Australian casualties. See Barter 1996, pp. 313–314.) The Royal Australian Regiment was subsequently granted the battle honour "Chongju". Following the capture of the town the US 21st Infantry Regiment had set off rapidly along the road to Sonchon to the west. Encountering only one strong KPA position which they quickly turned, by noon on 1 November the lead battalion had reached Chonggodong, just 30 kilometres (19 mi) from the Yalu River where the Americans clashed with another KPA armoured force. To the north meanwhile, the US 5th and 9th Infantry Regiments of the 24th Division secured Taechon and Kusong, before advancing to within 40 kilometres (25 mi) of the Manchurian border.

=== Subsequent operations ===
During the last weeks of October the Chinese had moved 18 divisions of the People's Volunteer Army across the Yalu River under the overall command of Marshal Peng Dehuai in order to reinforce the remnants of the KPA. Undetected by US and South Korean intelligence, the 13th Army Group crossed the border on 16 October and penetrated up to 100 kilometres (62 mi) into North Korea, and were reinforced in early November by 12 divisions from the 9th Army Group; in total 30 divisions composed of 380,000 men. The Chinese subsequently ambushed MacArthur's forces which were now widely dispersed, decimating ROK II Corps at Onjong and encircling and overrunning the US 8th Cavalry Regiment at Unsan. Ultimately Chongju was the furthest north that 27th British Commonwealth Brigade was to penetrate. Walsh, by then an observer at US Eighth Army headquarters, was urgently posted to resume command of 3 RAR following Green's death, however he was relieved of his position by Coad just six days later in the wake of the Battle of Pakchon on 5 November that cost the battalion heavily, losing 12 killed and 64 wounded despite killing 200 PVA. The battalion second-in-command, Major Bruce Ferguson, subsequently assumed command. Suffering significant casualties, the PVA offensive was halted the next day due to logistics difficulties.

== Notes ==
Footnotes

Citations
