= Charles Green (Australian soldier) =

Australian infantry battalion commander (1919–1950)

Lieutenant Colonel Charles Green DSO
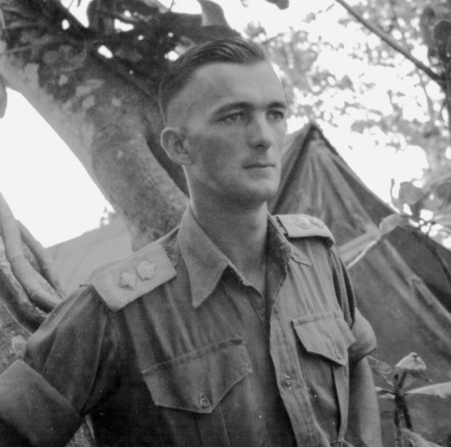
- Charles Green at Wewak, New Guinea, in September 1945
- Born: 26 December 1919; Grafton, Australia
- Died: 1 November 1950 (aged 30); Anju, North Korea
- Burial place: United Nations Memorial Cemetery Pusan, South Korea
- Military career
- Service: Australian Army
- Service years: 1936–1950
- Rank: Lieutenant Colonel
- Units: 41st Battalion; 2/2nd Battalion
- Commands: 2/11th Battalion; 41st Battalion; 3rd Battalion, Royal Australian Regiment
- Conflicts: World War II; North African Campaign; Battle of Greece; Aitape-Wewak campaign; Korean War; UN offensive into North Korea; Battle of the Apple Orchard; Battle of the Broken Bridge; Battle of Chongju (DOW)
- Awards: Distinguished Service Order; Silver Star (United States)

Charles Hercules Green DSO (26 December 1919 – 1 November 1950) was an Australian military officer who was the youngest Australian Army infantry battalion commander during World War II. He went on to command the 3rd Battalion, Royal Australian Regiment (3 RAR), during the Korean War, where he died of wounds. He remains the only commanding officer of a Royal Australian Regiment battalion to die on active service. Green joined the part-time Militia in 1936, and before the outbreak of World War II had been commissioned as a lieutenant. He volunteered for overseas service soon after the war began in September 1939, and served in the Middle East and the Battle of Greece with the 2/2nd Battalion. After the action at Pineios Gorge on 18 April 1941, Green became separated from the main body of the battalion, and made his way through Turkey to Palestine, to rejoin the reformed 2/2nd Battalion. The 2/2nd Battalion returned to Australia in August 1942 via Ceylon (modern Sri Lanka), to meet the threat posed by the Japanese.

Green performed instructional duties and attended courses until July 1943 when he rejoined the 2/2nd Battalion as its second-in-command. At the time, the unit was training in Queensland. From March to July 1945, Green commanded the 2/11th Battalion during the Aitape-Wewak campaign in New Guinea. For his performance during the campaign, Green was appointed a Companion of the Distinguished Service Order. After the war, Green briefly returned to civilian life and part-time military service as commanding officer of the 41st Battalion. When the Regular Army was formed, Green returned to full-time service in early 1949.

He was attending Staff College when the Korean War broke out in June 1950, and Army Headquarters selected him to command 3 RAR, which deployed as part of the United Nations Command formed to fight the North Koreans. After a brief period of training in Japan, where 3 RAR was part of the British Commonwealth Occupation Force, Green led the battalion to Korea in late September. Immediately pressed into action as part of the 27th British Commonwealth Brigade, the battalion advanced as part of the UN offensive into North Korea. Sharp fighting followed between 3 RAR and Korean People's Army (KPA) forces, during the Battle of the Apple Orchard, the Battle of the Broken Bridge and the Battle of Chongju. The day after the latter battle, 30 October, Green was resting in his tent in a reserve position when he was wounded in the abdomen by a shell fragment. Evacuated to hospital, he died two days later, aged 30, and was posthumously awarded the US Silver Star. Green was a popular and respected commanding officer, whose loss was keenly felt by his men. According to three officers who served with 3 RAR in Korea, he is considered one of the Australian Army's better unit-level commanders. As recently as 1996, his career was described as an inspiration to serving Australian soldiers.

== Early life ==
Born on 26 December 1919 at Grafton in north-eastern New South Wales, Charles Hercules Green was the second of three children of his parents, Australian-born Hercules John Green and Bertha née DeVille. He attended school at Swan Creek Public School and Grafton High School. In 1933, Green began working for his father on the family dairy farm. He also did ploughing and road construction work using two draught horses he acquired. Green was enthusiastic about the sport of cricket as well as horse riding. On 28 October 1936, at the age of 16, he enlisted in the 41st Battalion, a part-time infantry unit of the Militia. In 1938 Green was promoted to sergeant, and was commissioned as a lieutenant on 20 March 1939, aged 19.

== World War II ==
=== Middle East and Greece ===
With the outbreak of World War II, Green volunteered for overseas service and on 13 October 1939, he enlisted in the Second Australian Imperial Force (2nd AIF) which was being raised for that purpose. He was posted to the 2/2nd Battalion, which was one of the first units raised upon the outbreak of the war and formed part of the 16th Brigade that was assigned to the 6th Division. The 2/2nd Battalion was deployed to the Middle East in February 1940. Green initially served as one of the 2/2nd's platoon commanders, but accidentally injured himself, and missed out on taking part in 6th Division's first combat action, which took place during the North African campaign between December 1940 and January 1941.

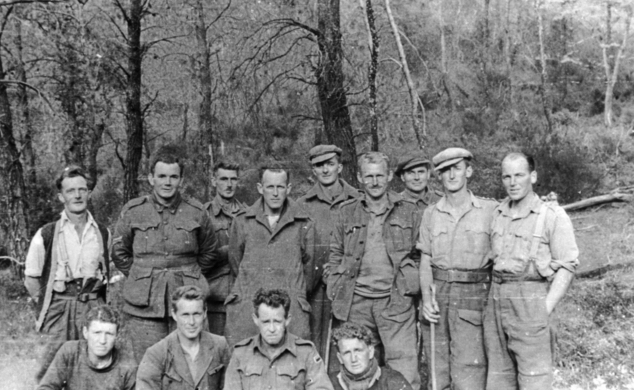
Officers and men of the 2/2nd Battalion on Euboea in the Aegean Islands in May 1941 after escaping from mainland Greece (Green is back row centre with cap)

On 12 March he was promoted to captain, and on the 22nd the battalion arrived in Greece to repel the anticipated German invasion. The battalion was deployed north into the Macedonia region to face the German assault, which began on 6 April. It took up positions at Veria on 7 April, but the Allied armies withdrew, so the battalion did not fight until mid-April. Green and the rest of the 2/2nd Battalion saw action at Pineios Gorge on 18 April. The British and Commonwealth forces attempted to block the German advance at the Gorge. They were quickly overwhelmed by the larger German forces, the 2/2nd Battalion losing 44 killed or wounded and 55 taken prisoner in desperate fighting. This resulted in the members of the battalion being dispersed into the surrounding hills. While elements of the battalion were able to rejoin the main forces withdrawing south to embark on ships, others were forced to make their escape independently.

Green and many other members of the battalion evaded capture by undertaking a hazardous journey through the Aegean Islands, then Turkey, to Palestine, which Green reached on 23 May. Green reached the island of Euboea in the Aegean on 7 May, where he met several other members of the battalion. They travelled on to the island of Skyros, and after narrow escapes from detection by German troops and aircraft, reached Smyrna (modern İzmir) on the Turkish coast, where they obtained the assistance of two Turkish officers who had fought the Australians at Gallipoli in World War I. Disguised as "English civil engineers" they caught a train to Alexandretta (modern İskenderun), from where they boarded a Norwegian ship to Port Said, Egypt. Green learned a great deal from his experiences in Greece. According to Margaret Barter, the author of his entry in the Australian Dictionary of Biography, he contributed a "sensitive account" of the campaign to a battalion history, Nulli Secundus Log, which was published in 1946. During his time in Greece, Green developed a reputation as a calm and reassuring leader who communicated clearly with the soldiers under his command, a fellow officer observing that "[t]roops would follow Charlie anywhere because he understood them and they understood he was fair dinkum [meaning: authentic]".

After being rebuilt in Palestine, the 2/2nd Battalion was sent to undertake garrison duties in northern Syria between October 1941 and January 1942. On 11 March it left the Middle East to return to Australia to meet the threat posed by the Japanese. On the way home, the 16th Brigade was diverted to defend Ceylon (modern Sri Lanka), where the 2/2nd Battalion was part of the garrison between 27 March and 13 July. Green was temporarily promoted to major on 19 June.

=== Australia ===
The battalion finally disembarked at Melbourne on 4 August. Having injured his foot and contracted typhoid while in Ceylon, when the 2/2nd was sent to New Guinea in September, Green was unable to join them. On 30 December, having been substantively promoted to major in September, he was posted as an instructor to the First Australian Army's Junior Tactical School in Southport, Queensland. He married Edna Olwyn Warner at St Paul's Anglican Church, Ulmarra, New South Wales, on 30 January 1943; his best man was his former commanding officer, Colonel Frederick Chilton. Green's posting to the First Army Junior Tactical School ended on 31 March 1943. On 26 June he took up an instructional position at the Junior Wing of the Land Headquarters Tactical School at Beenleigh, Queensland.

Green returned to regimental duties in July 1943 and was made second-in-command of the 2/2nd Battalion, which had returned from New Guinea after fighting in the Kokoda Trail campaign and the subsequent Battle of Buna–Gona, and was training in north Queensland. Although Green was considered the natural successor to the previous commanding officer, now-Brigadier Cedric Edgar, his posting as second-in-command alleviated the tensions created by the appointment of an "outsider"—Lieutenant Colonel Allan Cameron—to command the battalion. Green undertook the senior officers' course at the Land Headquarters Tactical School between 18 August and 1 November 1944. During this course he was described as an "outstanding student". Chilton later observed, "Although quite young at the time he was very mature; a quiet, calm man, obviously with exceptional reserves of and force of character".

=== Aitape-Wewak campaign ===
On 30 December 1944, Green arrived in the town of Aitape, on the north coast of New Guinea, where the 6th Division was taking over responsibility for the area from US forces. On 9 March 1945, Green took over command of the 2/11th Battalion, part of Brigadier James Martin's 19th Brigade of the 6th Division. At the age of only 25 he was the youngest Australian battalion commander during the war. Green was promoted to temporary lieutenant colonel five days later.

The battalion had landed at Aitape on 13 November 1944 to take part in the Aitape-Wewak campaign against the Japanese 18th Army. For the 2/11th Battalion, the campaign consisted mainly of arduous patrolling operations. Before Green took command, the unit had been part of the push by the 19th Brigade along the coast east of the Danmap River from 17 December to 20 January 1945. During this advance, the battalion lost 20 killed and 29 wounded, and killed 118 Japanese.

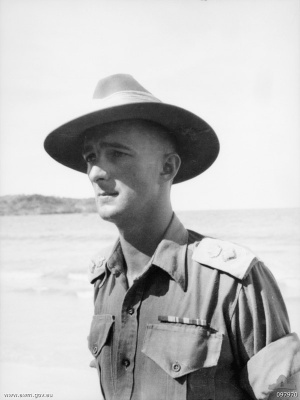
Green on Wirui Beach at Wewak after the Aitape-Wewak campaign

In early April, after Green had taken charge, the 19th Brigade was committed to an offensive against Wewak, and concentrated at the base at the village of But. As part of this offensive, the 2/11th and the 2/7th Commando Squadron were sent on a wide sweeping movement inland to cut off the Japanese, who were abandoning Wewak in the face of pressure from the 2/4th Battalion and withdrawing their main force into the Prince Alexander Mountains. After an arduous cross-country march across a swamp, the battalion arrived near Wirui Mission on 10 May and killed three Japanese who stumbled into their perimeter. This was followed by a series of clashes, culminating in the capture of a hill on 15 May by a company that lost four killed and 18 wounded, while killing 16 Japanese and capturing four machine guns. This was considered the hardest fighting the battalion had been involved in since arriving in New Guinea. This fighting in the foothills continued until the 27th when Green ordered a two-company attack to clear a pocket of Japanese. Supported by a 2,360-round artillery bombardment, the two companies killed 15 Japanese for the loss of two killed and six wounded. In total, during the May offensive, the 2/11th lost 23 killed and 63 wounded, and by the end of the month it was only 552 strong from a strength of 627 at the beginning of May, and only fielded 223 riflemen instead of 397. Soldiers from Headquarters Company were redistributed to the rifle companies to bring them closer to establishment strength.

At the end of May, the 19th Brigade received orders to capture Mount Tazaki and Mount Shiburangu in the Prince Alexander Mountains. Initially, the 2/11th was placed in reserve, as it was depleted and its soldiers were weary. On 10 June, the battalion was given the task of protecting the area from Boram airfield to Cape Moem, and on the 19th the battalion contributed one company for an attack on Mount Tazaki. After an airstrike and artillery bombardment, B Company of the 2/11th secured its objective which had been abandoned by the Japanese. In early July, the 8th Brigade relieved elements of the 19th Brigade, including the 2/11th. During the Aitape-Wewak campaign, the 2/11th suffered 144 casualties.

As a result of his efforts while commanding the 2/11th, Green was later appointed a Companion of the Distinguished Service Order (DSO). (Note: Green's brigade commander, Brigadier James Martin, recommended him for appointment as an Officer of the Order of the British Empire. This was endorsed by Major General Horace Robertson, commanding the 6th Division, but was upgraded to a Companion of the Distinguished Service Order by Lieutenant General Vernon Sturdee of the First Army. That recommendation was in turn endorsed by General Thomas Blamey, Commander-in-Chief, Australian Military Forces, and Green was duly awarded the DSO on 6 March 1947.) The citation highlighted: the challenging terrain and conditions throughout the campaign; the interdiction of the battalion's supply lines by the Japanese early in the campaign; the particularly stiff and determined enemy resistance and considerable casualties; Green's deft handling of his logistics; his outstanding leadership which helped him maintain morale and efficiency within the battalion; and the fact that all objectives assigned to the unit during the campaign were achieved. After the Japanese surrendered on 15 August, members of the battalion began to be sent home in groups to Australia for demobilisation. The last members of the unit left Wewak on 10 November.

== Post World War II ==
After being discharged from the 2nd AIF on 23 November 1945, Green was placed on the Reserve of Officers List on 21 December. He returned to Grafton where he worked as a clerk at the Producers' Co-operative Distributing Society Ltd. He also studied accountancy on a part-time basis. During this time he and his wife had a daughter, Anthea, and his award of the DSO was announced on 6 March 1947. When Australia's part-time military force was re-raised under the guise of Citizens Military Forces, Green returned to the 41st Battalion, serving as its commanding officer from 1 April 1948. With the establishment of the Regular Army, Green returned to full-time military service on 6 January 1949. In 1950 he was selected to attend Staff College at Fort Queenscliff, Victoria.

== Korean War ==
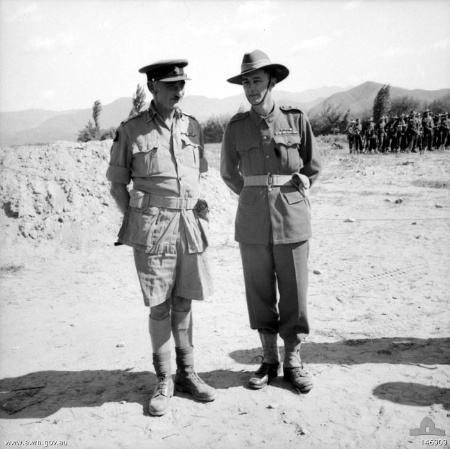
Green (right) with Brigadier Basil Coad, commander of 27th British Commonwealth Brigade, at Taegu, South Korea, on 28 September 1950

On 25 June 1950, the Korean People's Army (KPA) crossed the border from North Korea into South Korea and advanced towards the capital Seoul, which fell in less than a week. The KPA continued toward the port of Pusan and two days later, the United States offered its assistance to South Korea. In response, the United Nations Security Council requested United Nations (UN) member states to assist in repelling the North Korean attack. Australia initially committed North American P-51 Mustang fighter-bombers from No. 77 Squadron RAAF and infantry from the 3rd Battalion, Royal Australian Regiment (3 RAR), both of which were stationed in Japan as part of the British Commonwealth Occupation Force (BCOF). When the war broke out, 3 RAR was understaffed, underequipped and unprepared for combat as a unit. Immediate action was taken to bring it up to strength with reinforcements and new equipment from Australia, along with an intense training program.

When the Australian government committed 3 RAR, Army Headquarters determined that it would be led by an officer who had served in World War II and had a distinguished record. The commanding officer, Lieutenant Colonel F. S. Walsh, who had been in command of the battalion for a year, was to be replaced. Still attending Staff College, Green was chosen. He left Australia for Japan on 8 September, and took over command of 3 RAR on 12 September. He oversaw another two weeks of unit training in Japan, then flew to South Korea on 25 September to await the battalion's arrival. 3 RAR arrived in Pusan on 28 September. By that time, the KPA was retreating back into North Korea following the Inchon landings and Pusan Perimeter Offensive. Green's battalion joined Brigadier Basil Coad's 27th British Commonwealth Brigade, part of the force under the commander-in-chief United Nations Command, General of the Army Douglas MacArthur. On 5 October, the entire brigade was airlifted by the United States Air Force (USAF) from Taegu to Kimpo Air Base outside Seoul, their vehicles driving the intervening 420 km (260 mi) and only arriving in Seoul on 9 October. The brigade then moved north under the operational control of the US 1st Cavalry Division.

The 27th British Commonwealth Brigade advanced towards Pyongyang via Kaesong, Kumchon and Hungsu-ri to Sariwon. Attached to Green's battalion were a platoon of US M4 Sherman tanks and a US field artillery battery. On 16 October, the brigade led the division towards the outskirts of Sariwon. During that and the following day, 3 RAR advanced 70 km (43 mi) from Kumchon to Sariwon, and entered that town on the evening of the 17th. In chaotic scenes, the brigade and elements of a KPA division both occupied the centre of town for some time. In one incident, Green's second-in-command, Major Ian Bruce Ferguson, captured 1,600 North Koreans with just an interpreter, a loudspeaker and a tank. There was no rest for the brigade as it continued its push through Pyongyang to the village of Sangapo. To cut off KPA units retreating towards the Yalu River, the US 187th Airborne Regimental Combat Team was parachuted around Yongju north of Pyongyang. The 27th British Commonwealth Brigade advanced almost to Yongju against minor opposition, and initial contact was made between the Commonwealth and US airborne forces on the evening of 21 October.

=== Battle of the Apple Orchard ===
Green's battalion was involved in its first major action on 22 October. The battle began as 3 RAR led the brigade north of Yongju when C Company and Green's battalion tactical headquarters following it were attacked from front and rear by a KPA force of around 1,000 soldiers. C Company aggressively counter-attacked, and while the KPA troops fought "with desperate bravery" and regrouped in an apple orchard to the east of the road, the Australians, supported by US tanks, quickly prevailed. By the time mopping up was completed, 3 RAR had suffered seven wounded, but had killed between 150 and 200 KPA troops and taken 239 prisoners. The battle was the first large-scale engagement fought by a battalion of the Royal Australian Regiment, which had only been established on 23 November 1948. A US Army historian wrote that 3 RAR had fought "with a dash that brought forth admiration from all who witnessed it". Green has been credited with the excellent performance of the battalion in its first major action, Coad observing that he was "a fine fighting soldier, so quiet in his manner ... he inspired confidence, both with his superiors and subordinates".

=== Battle of the Broken Bridge ===
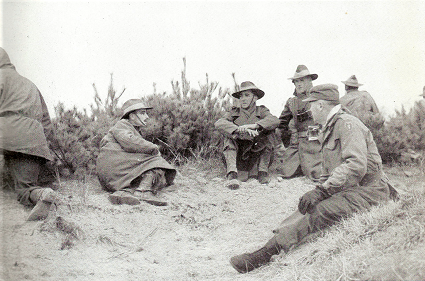
Green (left) and other Australian officers confer with an American commander before the clearance of Pakchon

Three days later, Green's battalion was again the brigade vanguard after it had crossed the Chongchon River and advanced towards Pakchon. When the lead elements of 3 RAR reached the Taeryong River near Kujin it found KPA engineers had destroyed the centre span of the bridge. A reconnaissance patrol crossed the river using debris. When aerial reconnaissance identified KPA forces on the high ground, Green ordered the patrol to withdraw to the near side of the river, which they did, bringing ten prisoners with them. Airstrikes and the battalion mortars were called in onto the KPA positions across the river, and Green ordered D Company to clear nearby Pakchon. Once this was achieved—D Company returned with 225 prisoners—he sent A and B Companies across the river to establish a bridgehead, commencing at 19:00. Using the broken bridge, the two companies crossed without KPA resistance and established positions on both sides of the road about 400 m (440 yd) north of the river, with A Company on the left and B Company on the right.

That night, the KPA made several concerted attacks on both forward companies, B Company suffering the worst. Green sent reinforcements from C Company across the river to bolster B Company. About 04:00 on 26 October, the KPA launched an attack on both forward companies supported by T-34 tanks, but the level of coordination needed to push the Australians from the bridgehead was lacking, and while the KPA assault was renewed, by dawn the two companies remained in position. Airstrikes, including napalm, were called in on the KPA elements holding the ridges north of the river, and late that morning the remaining rifle companies of 3 RAR joined the forward companies, and after a flanking effort by other elements of the brigade, the KPA withdrew. KPA casualties in the battle were 100 killed and 350 captured, Green's battalion suffering eight killed—its first fatalities of the war—and 22 wounded.

=== Battle of Chongju and death ===
The brigade continued its advance, and Green's battalion again took over the vanguard role on 29 October about 6 km (3.7 mi) from Chongju. Aerial reconnaissance indicated that a KPA force of around 500–600, supported by tanks and self-propelled guns (SPGs), had established well-constructed and camouflaged defensive positions on a thickly wooded ridgeline south of the town. A series of airstrikes was called in, and by 14:00 the USAF were claiming considerable success. With only a few hours of daylight left, Green ordered a battalion attack with D Company on the left of the road and A Company on the right, following an artillery bombardment.

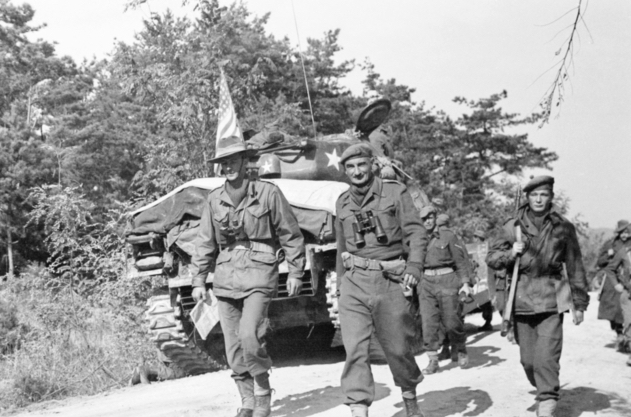
The last photograph of Green (left), taken on 29 October. Coad is walking alongside him.

The two companies attacked before dusk, D Company being supported by US tanks, and despite the heavy enemy fire, both secured their objectives on the ridge by 17:30. Eleven T-34 tanks and two SU-76 SPGs were destroyed by 3 RAR and the accompanying tanks, contrary to the reports of their destruction by USAF airstrikes earlier in the day. Green moved B Company up to occupy the road between the two assault companies, moved battalion headquarters in behind them, and held C and Support Companies in reserve at the rear. A hasty and limited resupply followed as the unit dug in.

The KPA counter-attacked in battalion strength following preparatory artillery fire beginning at 19:00, first against D Company. Although the North Koreans managed to overrun parts of the company position, counter-attacks restored the situation after two hours of fierce fighting. D Company was cut off from battalion headquarters for some time by infiltrating KPA troops, who were cleared away by Headquarters Company. A second assault fell on A company, but it was beaten off in heavy fighting, the company commander calling in artillery within 10 m (11 yd) of his forward positions. The KPA withdrew about 22:15. In the morning, 150 dead KPA soldiers were found inside the 3 RAR perimeter. The total KPA casualties in the battle were 162 killed and ten captured, while Green's battalion suffered nine dead and 30 wounded. The fighting around Chongju was the heaviest undertaken by the Australians since they had entered the war.

The battalion moved forward to a reserve position on the Talchon River on 30 October, while other brigade elements cleared Chongju itself, securing it by 17:00. For protection, Green sited his battalion headquarters on the reverse slope, with the rifle companies on the forward slope. Around dusk at 18:10, six high-velocity shells, likely from a KPA SPG or tank, hit the battalion position. Five of the shells landed on the forward slope, while the sixth cleared the crest and detonated to the rear of the C Company position after hitting a tree. In his tent on a stretcher after 36 hours without sleep, Green was severely wounded in the abdomen by a fragment from the wayward round. He was evacuated to a Mobile Army Surgical Hospital at Anju but succumbed to his wounds and died two days later on 1 November, aged 30. Forty other men who had been in the vicinity when the shell exploded were unhurt.

A popular and respected commanding officer, Green's loss was keenly felt by the Australians, and according to Barter, "cast a pall of gloom over his battalion". Ferguson, who was soon appointed to command 3 RAR, asserted that Green was "the best commander any man could ever have", and according to three officers that served with 3 RAR in Korea, he was one of the Australian Army's better unit-level commanders. Coad kept a photograph of Green in his study for the remainder of his life. Green remains the only commanding officer of a battalion of the Royal Australian Regiment to die on active service.

== Legacy ==
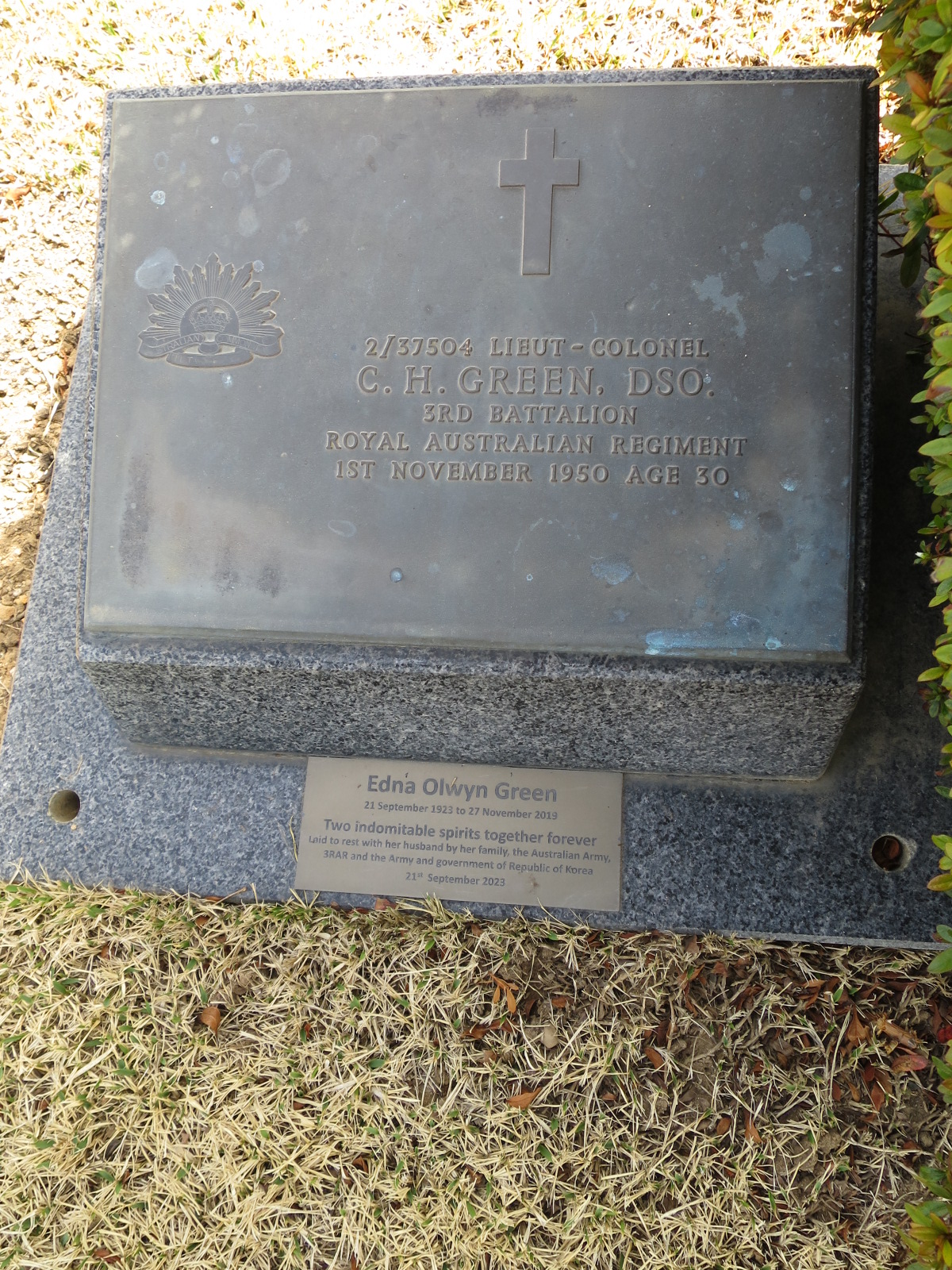
Green's grave at the UN Memorial Cemetery

Green was initially buried in the Christian churchyard at Pakchon on the day he died, but his body was soon exhumed and buried in the United Nations Memorial Cemetery (UNMC) in Pusan. He was posthumously awarded the US Silver Star in June 1951. According to Barter, Green's career as a battalion commander in New Guinea and Korea had been "exemplary", and serving Australian soldiers were still inspired by it at the time she wrote his entry in 1996. A commemorative cairn was erected at the barracks of the 41st Battalion, Royal New South Wales Regiment, in Lismore, New South Wales, and as of 1996, a United Nations emblem was affixed to the gates of the Swan Creek farm where he grew up.

Green's wife, Olwyn, who survived him along with their daughter, wrote his biography, The Name's Still Charlie, which was published in 1993 and republished in 2010. Following her death, Olwyn's remains were buried with Green's at the UNMC on 21 September 2023.
