= David Butler (general) =

Senior officer in the Australian Army (1928–2020)

David Matheson Butler
- Born: 3 September 1928; Guildford, Western Australia
- Died: 24 November 2020 (aged 92); Sydney, New South Wales
- Military career
- Allegiance: Australia
- Branch: Australian Army
- Service years: 1946–1984
- Rank: Major General
- Commands: Training Command (1982–84); 1st Task Force (c. 1977–79); Officer Cadet School, Portsea (1972–74); 6th Battalion, Royal Australian Regiment (1968–70)
- Conflicts: Korean War; Battle of Yongju; Battle of Kujin; Battle of Chongju; Vietnam War
- Awards: Officer of the Order of Australia; Distinguished Service Order; Silver Star (United States)

Major General David Matheson Butler, AO, DSO (3 September 1928 – 24 November 2020) was senior officer of the Australian Army. He saw service during the Korean War with the 3rd Battalion, Royal Australian Regiment, and later as the commanding officer of 6th Battalion, Royal Australian Regiment during the Vietnam War.
