= Battle of Kujin =

1950 battle of the Korean War

Coordinates: 39°42′34″N 125°34′08″E

- Part of the Korean War
- Australian soldiers scaling the "Broken Bridge" on the Taeryong River near Kujin, October 1950.
Date	25–26 October 1950
Location	Kujin, North Korea
Result	United Nations victory

Belligerents
United Nations: United Kingdom; Australia; United States	North Korea

Commanders and leaders
(United Kingdom) Basil Aubrey Coad (Australia) Charles Green	(North Korea) Kim In-sik

Units involved
27th Infantry Brigade; (Australia) 3 RAR; (United Kingdom) 1 ASHR; (United Kingdom) 1 MR	(North Korea) 17th Tank Bde

Casualties and losses
8 killed 22 wounded	100 killed 350 captured

The Battle of Kujin (25–26 October 1950), also known as the Battle of the Broken Bridge, took place during the United Nations Command (UN) offensive towards the Yalu River, which followed the North Korean invasion of South Korea at the start of the Korean War. The battle was fought between Australian forces from 3rd Battalion, Royal Australian Regiment (3 RAR) and elements of the 17th Tank Brigade of the Korean People's Army (KPA) over a key bridge across the Taeryong River near Kujin, North Korea. On 25 October the 27th British Commonwealth Brigade had resumed their advance towards Pakchon after crossing the Chongchon River, with 3 RAR as the lead battalion. Arriving at Kujin, the Australians discovered that the centre span of the 300-metre (330 yd) concrete bridge had been demolished by KPA engineers, blocking their passage across the river. A platoon-sized reconnaissance patrol crossed the river using debris from the destroyed span; however, it was soon forced to withdraw by KPA holding the high ground. Airstrikes and artillery fire were subsequently called in at 17:15 by the Australians as they prepared to conduct an assault.

At 19:00 that evening, following the clearance of nearby Pakchon by D Company 3 RAR, the Australians sent two companies across the river to establish a bridgehead and prevent the KPA from consolidating their position on the western bank. A and B Companies subsequently established defensive positions on either side of the road. Shortly afterwards KPA forces were detected forming up for an assault on the right flank against B Company, and these preparations were broken up with mortars. The KPA then engaged the forward Australian companies with mortar fire which was largely ineffective. However, by 22:30 KPA activity increased significantly, with heavy small arms fire causing a number of casualties among the Australians which perilously had to be evacuated under fire by boat across the fast flowing tidal river. Further artillery support was called in by the Australians at 23:00 in response to renewed concentrations by the KPA in preparation for an assault. Meanwhile, the Australians sent another platoon across the river to reinforce the companies on the western bank.

At 04:00 on 26 October the KPA counterattacked A and B Companies, supported by two T-34 tanks. In the ensuing fighting a convoy of KPA vehicles, including a tank, two jeeps, a motorcycle and about 60 infantry moved down the road towards A Company with the intention of re-occupying the ridges overlooking the river crossing. The Australians ambushed the convoy at close range with small arms fire and mortars, forcing the KPA to flee after abandoning their vehicles with only the tank successfully shooting its way out. Later another T-34 tank and supporting infantry pressed to within 10 metres (33 ft) of the B Company headquarters, before stopping and taking up a position between the ridges unaware of the location of the Australians. By dawn the Australians were still in possession of the bridgehead. At 07:00, a further airstrike was called in on the KPA holding the ridges to the west of the 3 RAR positions. With the way reported clear, C and D Companies crossed the river from the eastern bank later that morning. The battle continued during the morning; however, by 12:00 the KPA finally withdrew, abandoning the bridge to the Australians.

== Background ==
=== Military situation ===
The Korean War began early in the morning of 25 June 1950, following the surprise invasion of the Republic of Korea by its northern neighbour, the communist Democratic People's Republic of Korea (DPRK). Numerically superior and better equipped, the KPA crossed the 38th Parallel and rapidly advanced south, easily overcoming the inferior Republic of Korea Army (ROK). In response, the United Nations decided to intervene on behalf of South Korea, inviting member states to send forces to restore the situation. As a consequence, American ground forces were hastily deployed in an attempt to prevent the South Koreans from collapsing; however, they too were understrength and poorly equipped, and by early August had been forced back by the KPA to an enclave around Pusan, known as the Pusan Perimeter. Key US allies—Britain, Canada and Australia—also committed forces, although these were initially limited to naval contingents and were largely viewed as token efforts in the US. Under diplomatic pressure the British agreed to deploy an infantry brigade in July, and would later dispatch a second brigade as the crisis worsened. The Canadians also agreed to provide an infantry brigade, although the first battalion would not arrive until December 1950. A total of 21 UN member states eventually contributed forces.

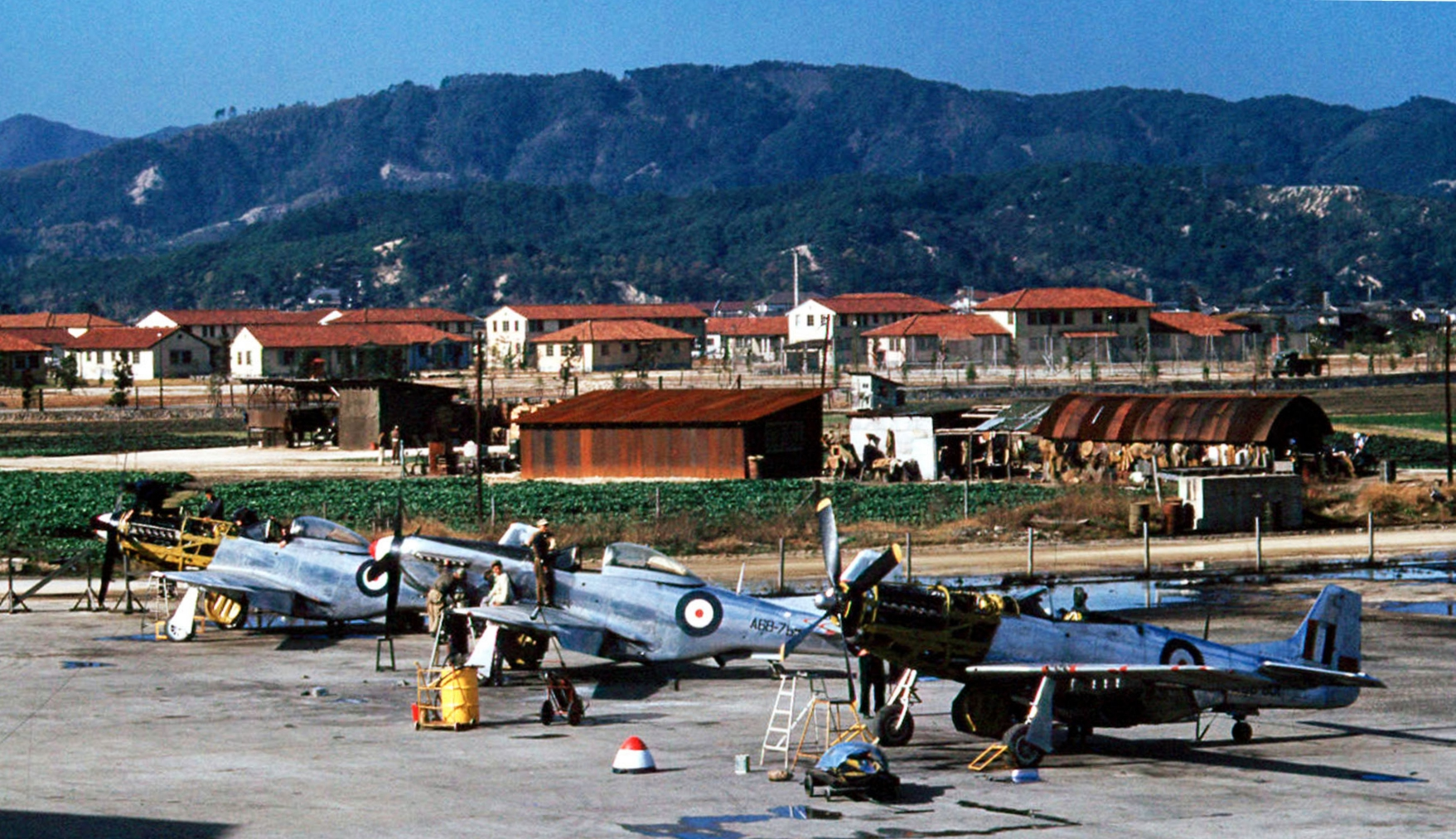
P-51 Mustang fighters from No. 77 Squadron RAAF at Iwakuni, 1950.

Australia was one of the first nations to commit units to the fighting, playing a small but sometimes significant part in the UN forces, which was initially led by General Douglas MacArthur. Forces deployed in Japan as part of the British Commonwealth Occupation Force formed the basis of the Australian response, with P-51 Mustang fighter-bombers from No. 77 Squadron RAAF flying their first missions on 2 July, while the frigate HMAS Shoalhaven and the destroyer HMAS Bataan were also committed to naval operations. During this time the 3rd Battalion, Royal Australian Regiment (3 RAR), which had been preparing to return to Australia prior to the outbreak of the war, remained in Japan; however, on 26 July the Australian government announced that it would also commit the understrength and poorly equipped infantry battalion to the fighting, following a period of preparation. Training and re-equipment began immediately, while hundreds of reinforcements were hastily recruited in Australia as part of K Force; they soon began arriving to fill out the battalion. The battalion's commanding officer, Lieutenant Colonel Floyd Walsh, was subsequently replaced by Lieutenant Colonel Charles Green. An officer with extensive operational experience fighting the Japanese in New Guinea during the Second World War, Green took over from Walsh due to the latter's perceived inexperience.

On 23 September 1950, 3 RAR embarked for Korea, concentrating at Pusan on 28 September. There it joined the British 27th Infantry Brigade, a garrison formation hurriedly committed from Hong Kong by the British as the situation deteriorated around the Pusan Perimeter in late August to bolster the US Eighth Army under Lieutenant General Walton Walker. Commanded by Brigadier Basil Coad, the brigade was renamed the 27th British Commonwealth Brigade and consisted of the 1st Battalion, Argyll and Sutherland Highland Regiment (1 ASHR), the 1st Battalion, Middlesex Regiment (1 MR) and 3 RAR. Understrength, the two British battalions had each mustered just 600 men of all ranks, while the brigade was also short on transport and heavy equipment, and had no integral artillery support, for which it would rely entirely on the Americans until the 16th Field Regiment, Royal New Zealand Artillery arrived in January 1951. As such, with a strength of nearly 1,000 men, the addition of 3 RAR gave the brigade increased tactical weight as well as expediently allowing the Australians to work within a familiar organisational environment, rather than being attached to a US formation. Also under the command of the brigade were a number of US Army units, including 155 mm howitzers from the 90th Field Artillery Battalion, M4 Sherman tanks from 89th Tank Battalion and a company from the US 72nd Combat Engineer Battalion.

== Prelude ==
=== Opposing forces ===
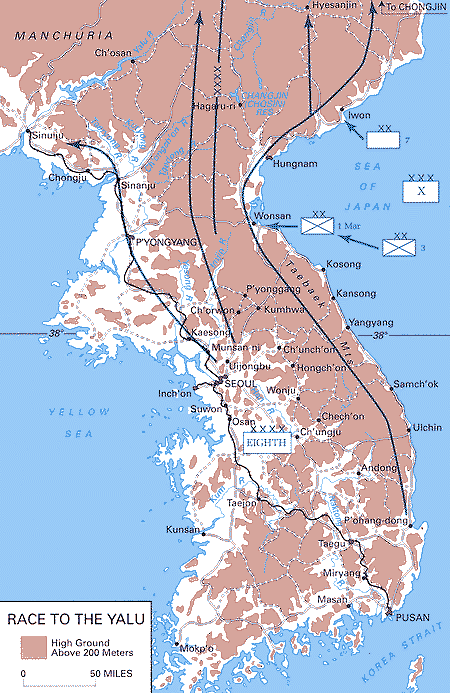
Map of the UN advance toward the Yalu River, 1950.

By the time 3 RAR arrived in the theatre, the KPA had been broken and were in rapid retreat, with MacArthur's forces conducting a successful amphibious assault at Inchon and breakout from the Pusan Perimeter on the southern tip of the Korean peninsula. A steady advance began, driving the North Koreans northwards towards the 38th Parallel. The 27th British Commonwealth Brigade was airlifted from Taegu to Kimpo Airfield north of Seoul on 5 October; however, its vehicles had to move by road, driving 420 kilometres (260 mi), and did not arrive until 9 October. It was subsequently attached to the US 1st Cavalry Division, under the command of Major General Hobart R. Gay. On 16 October the brigade took over from the US 7th Cavalry Regiment as the vanguard of the UN advance into North Korea, its axis intended to take it through Kaesong, Kumchon County and Hungsu-ri to Sariwon, then through Hwangju to the North Korean capital of Pyongyang. Although the KPA had suffered heavily in the preceding weeks, they continued to resist strongly, while a lack of accurate maps and the narrowness of the roads made rapid movement difficult for the advancing UN forces. During this time 3 RAR had a platoon of American M4 Sherman tanks attached and a battery of field guns in direct support.

The 27th British Commonwealth Brigade subsequently moved 70 kilometres (43 mi) from Kumchon, with the Argylls capturing Sariwon on 17 October, killing 215 KPA and taking many prisoners for the loss of one man killed and three wounded. The brigade then passed to the command of the US 24th Infantry Division on 21 October, under the overall command of Major General John H. Church, while the US 1st Cavalry Division remained in Pyongyang to complete its capture. The 27th British Commonwealth Brigade was subsequently ordered to seize Chongju. Consequently, the brigade continued to advance north with little respite, and on 22 October the Australians fought their first major action at Yongju, killing 150 KPA and capturing 239 of the brigade's 800 prisoners, for the loss of seven men wounded. Intending to defeat the KPA and bring the war to a close, the UN forces pushed towards the Yalu River, on the Chinese border. Resistance continued to be met as the brigade crossed the Chongchon River however, and they now moved towards Pakchon. On 24 October, MacArthur had removed all restrictions on the movement of his forces south of the Yalu River and prepared for the final phase of the UN advance, defying a directive of the US Joint Chiefs of Staff and risking Chinese intervention in support of North Korea.

With the Middlesex in the vanguard, the lead elements of the 27th British Commonwealth Brigade successfully crossed the Chongchon unopposed at Sinanju on 24 October using assault boats. The British battalion then established a defensive position overlooking the main bridge in preparation for the remainder of the brigade to continue the advance the following day. However, both the road and rail bridges at Sinanju had previously been damaged and they were subsequently found to be unsuitable for use by vehicles and armour, while the tidal current also prevented the rafting of even light vehicles by the American engineers attached to the brigade. Meanwhile, the road bridge at Anju, 5 kilometres (3.1 mi) east, was also found to be damaged by ROK 1st Infantry Division when it entered the town. Following repairs the bridge was made available to the 27th British Commonwealth Brigade's light wheeled vehicles on 25 October, while the accompanying Sherman tanks located a ford 4.8 kilometres (3.0 mi) upstream, and were able to cross the Chongchon at that point. With winter approaching, the British and Australians encountered the first of the cold weather as the temperature began to drop well below freezing at night. Consequently, prior to leaving Sinanju, purpose-designed American cold-weather clothing was issued; however, with stocks in short supply only a few of the men received the equipment, even after a second issue was arranged several days later.

== Battle ==
=== Fighting on the Taeryong River, 25 October 1950 ===
That afternoon Coad ordered 3 RAR to resume the lead and continue the advance towards Pakchon, the next major town 15 kilometres (9.3 mi) north on the Taeryong River. The Australians subsequently moved through the Middlesex, supported by tanks from D Company, 89th Tank Battalion. By 16:00 B Company 3 RAR had reached the village of Kujin, 3 kilometres (1.9 mi) south of Pakchon, where the main west coast road diverged from the road to Pakchon, turning west across the Taeryong River to continue towards Chongju and the Manchurian border. There the Australians discovered that the centre span of the 300-metre (330 yd) concrete bridge had been demolished by KPA engineers, blocking their passage across the river. Forced to halt, the 3-inch mortars from Support Company 3 RAR were brought into a position to provide indirect fire support to the battalion. Meanwhile, using roughly made timber ladders from the debris of the bridge, two sections of 4 Platoon under the command of Lieutenant Alan Morrison crossed the bridge covered by the remainder of B Company and the tanks in order to reconnoitre the far bank. On the other side of the river the road ran through a ridge which rose steeply 20 metres (22 yd) above the water. After advancing to the foot of the ridge, 50 KPA came forward from the hills to surrender to the Australians, and almost immediately they came under heavy but inaccurate fire from other KPA concealed in the hills. The surrendering KPA then scattered into the scrub, while the Australians returned fire. A United States Air Force (USAF) LT-6G Mosquito light spotter aircraft scouting beyond the western bank subsequently reported the presence of two KPA companies to the north, overlooking the bridgehead.

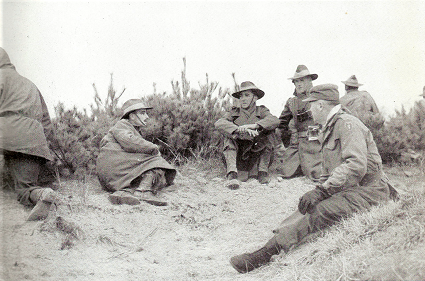
Green and other Australian officers confer with an American commander prior to the clearance of Pakchon.

Having established that the KPA held the high ground, Green ordered Morrison to withdraw across the bridge in order to allow an airstrike to take place from 17:15, with the platoon bringing 10 KPA prisoners with them as they did so. Two USAF F-80 Shooting Stars subsequently strafed the KPA positions across the river until 17:30. A and B Companies were then instructed to prepare to assault the KPA positions on the western bank; however, the approach of dusk prevented a second airstrike and a fire plan was subsequently arranged by the American artillery and the battalion mortars before a more substantial thrust across the river was launched by the Australians. In the meantime Green had also sent D Company into Pakchon to clear the town in order to protect the Australian right flank, and under the command of Major Walter Brown they reported entering the town at 17:00. D Company subsequently returned at 18:30, bringing 225 prisoners with them after leaving a platoon to guard the American engineers which had begun constructing a ford from a damaged underwater bridge for use the following day. Meanwhile, a KPA machine-gun sporadically engaged the Australians on their left, while strong concentrations of KPA troops were detected on the west bank.

=== 3 RAR establishes a bridgehead, 25/26 October 1950 ===
With the bridge considered important by the advancing Eighth Army, the Australians were determined to a force a passage across the river. However, with only a platoon from D Company holding a tenuous bridgehead at the Pakchon ford as dusk fell, Green could either cross the river the following morning via the ford, or he could attempt a lodgement across the bridge that night. He resolved to strengthen his position and at 19:00 A and B Companies were sent across the river to secure the bridgehead and prevent the KPA from being reinforced and consolidating their position on the western bank. Again using the broken span, the Australians crossed the river and scaled the bank in the moonlight, before establishing defensive positions on both sides of the road on the crest 400 metres (440 yd) from the Taeryong. Achieving their objectives the Australians then spread out along the ridgeline, with A Company under Captain William Chitts on the left and B Company on the right commanded by Major George Thirlwell. Unchallenged, the Australians suspected that the KPA had withdrawn and, still largely without winter clothing, they then began to dig-in amid a sub-zero wind which blew in from Manchuria, 97 kilometres (60 mi) away. Green deployed the remainder of the battalion on the eastern bank, with D Company to the north near Kujin, C Company to the east flanking the road to Sinanju and battalion headquarters located to the south in a paddy field. The American tanks were subsequently allocated to both C and D Companies and they provided rear security to the battalion during the night.

Shortly afterwards, at 19:30, B Company detected a KPA force of around company-size preparing for a frontal assault, and called-in mortar fire to break up their formations, while a number of forward patrols had to be withdrawn by the Australians in order to prevent their encirclement. In response the KPA fired mortars at the Australian positions with limited effect. Half an hour later KPA shells hit the 3 RAR battalion headquarters and C Company positions on the other side of the river, however the rounds landed in the damp soil of the paddy field and failed to explode. Periodically they were also targeted by machine-gun fire, but it was mostly high and posed little threat. Perhaps also under the impression that the Australians had withdrawn, the KPA failed to press their attack. Yet they soon realised their mistake and heavy small arms fire began again at 22:30 with KPA activity against A and B Companies increasing significantly, which resulted in B Company suffering two killed and three wounded. The Australian right flank was now exposed and following a request from Thirlwell, Chitts detached 1 Platoon under Lieutenant John Wathen to bolster B Company. At 23:00 further artillery and mortar fire missions were ordered by the Australians against the KPA in response to renewed concentrations in preparation for an assault. Around the same time 8 Platoon C Company under Lieutenant Colin Townsend was sent across the bridge in the darkness to further reinforce B Company, and they dug-in on each side of the road leading to the bridge. Telephone lines had been laid by the Australians to their forward companies, and despite the fighting they remained intact throughout the battle.

KPA activity continued throughout the night, and although this resulted in further casualties in A and B Companies, they were unable to penetrate the forward Australian positions. Among the dead was Wathen, whose platoon was attacked by the KPA after moving to cover the exposed B Company position, resulting in several other Australians also being wounded. Meanwhile, during the evening the 3 RAR Assault Pioneer Platoon had also discovered and destroyed a small KPA arms dump on the eastern bank of the river. The Australians subsequently attempted to evacuate their casualties from the forward companies, and although these had been relatively light the task proved perilous. With the bridge still down, the wounded had to be carried by hand on stretchers to the broken span and then lowered 6 metres (20 ft) to a boat borrowed from the American engineers. The boat was then hauled by ropes back across to the eastern bank of the river where the casualties were load into jeep ambulances. Despite a number of difficulties the majority of the casualties were successfully evacuated by these means, even as the bridge occasionally came under small arms fire. However, at around 01:00, while evacuating the final casualty, the boat came under fire again from KPA snipers and sank after being swept against a concrete piling. A wounded soldier fell into the fast flowing Taeryong River and the 3 RAR battalion drum-major, Sergeant Thomas Murray, subsequently dived into the freezing waters and rescued him. Murray was later awarded the George Medal for his actions.

Although a KPA SU-76 self-propelled gun had occasionally shelled Kujin with armour piercing rounds, there had been no reports of tanks being detected during the evening. However, at 04:00 on 26 October the KPA counterattacked the Australian companies with the support of T-34 tanks. In the ensuing fighting a convoy of KPA vehicles, including a T-34 tank, two jeeps, a motorcycle and about 60 infantry moved down the road towards A Company with the intention of re-occupying the ridges overlooking the river crossing, likely unaware of the Australian dispositions. The Australians held their fire until the entire force was within their field of fire, before ambushing it at close range with small arms fire from Bren light machine guns, rifles, grenades and mortars. The convoy was subsequently scattered and the KPA fled, abandoning their vehicles with only the tank successfully shooting its way out. Among the KPA dead was the commanding officer of the Reconnaissance Unit of the 17th Tank Brigade, Lieutenant Colonel Kim In-sik, who was carrying a number of marked maps and documents. These items were of considerable intelligence value and they revealed that the KPA were preparing a last line of defence at Chongju 70 kilometres (43 mi) away, with infantry supported by tanks.

Later another KPA T-34 tank and supporting infantry pressed to within 10 metres (33 ft) of the B Company headquarters, before stopping and taking up a position between the ridges still unaware of the location of the Australians. An attempt by the Australian infantrymen to engage the tank with a new M20 3.5-inch bazooka failed however after the weapon misfired, and it subsequently withdrew out of range. The tank then continued to fire randomly for the remainder of the night, without effect. In reserve, C Company was subsequently woken during the battle to send a number of their bazookas forward to replace those used by B Company as it was suspected that theirs were faulty due to being poorly maintained. However, in their first close engagement with KPA armour, it was possible that some of the Australians had simply forgotten to move the safety catches of their bazookas to the firing position in their excitement. Following firm directions the bazookas were used to good effect by 3 RAR in a number of encounters with tanks during the next few days. (Note: There is some conjecture on the actual cause of the weapons misfiring, Bartlett and Farrar-Hockley claim that the Australians had simply failed to move the safety catches to fire in their excitement, while other sources argue that it was the result of poor operator maintenance required by the weapon's delicate firing mechanism. It is likely that the misfire was the result of a failure of the weapon's firing mechanism. The ignition of the rocket motor occurred electronically from a generator located in the pistol grip. However, to preserve the generator it had been heavily packed in grease after leaving the factory, and this inhibited its operation. Solvent was required to be used to remove the grease prior to operation, and although it had been supplied to 3 RAR it had not been used in the confusion of the battalion's hasty preparation for deployment. Once this was discovered the grease was removed and the weapons were found to function correctly.) Regardless, despite using infantry mounted on tanks the KPA seemed unable to conduct the sort of organised or co-ordinated assault required to dislodge the Australians, and they were relatively untroubled for the rest of the night.

=== 27th British Commonwealth Brigade consolidates, 26 October 1950 ===
A US Army truck that had been carrying members of 3 RAR stands bogged following the battle. Taeryong River at Kujin, 26 October 1950.

By dawn the Australians were still in possession of the bridgehead across the Taeryong. A large number of undamaged KPA vehicles were subsequently found in front of their positions and they were soon pressed into service. At 07:00 a further airstrike by USAF F-80s was called-in on the KPA holding the ridges to the west of the 3 RAR positions, and they were subsequently strafed and attacked with napalm. With the way reported clear, C and D Companies crossed the river from the eastern bank later that morning. C Company subsequently took up a defensive position a few hundred metres forward of A Company on the left of the road, while D Company crossed the river at Pakchon and advanced 2 kilometres (1.2 mi) to occupy a dominant hill on the battalion's right flank. In spite of harassment by the KPA during the previous evening which had cost D Company four casualties, the American engineers at Pakchon had continued to work on the underwater bridge and the Sherman tanks were able to cross there by 11:00 that morning, although the water was still considered too deep for wheeled vehicles.

The battle continued during the morning; however, by 12:00 the KPA finally withdrew, abandoning the bridge to the Australians. Meanwhile, Coad put two companies from the Argylls across the Taeryong River on tanks at the Pakchon ford, and they met only slight opposition. The Middlesex then passed through them, moving south-west onto the main road in front of 3 RAR where they knocked out a KPA tank which was blocking their advance. By nightfall they had linked up with the Australians, consolidating their positions and securing a safe crossing for the remainder of the brigade, including the wheeled vehicles which followed that evening. KPA patrols attempted to harass the British and Australian outposts; however, despite their perimeter being shelled it proved to be a relatively quiet night for the 27th British Commonwealth Brigade.

== Aftermath ==
=== Casualties ===
To the Australians the fighting at Kujin became known as the "Battle of the Broken Bridge", and resulted in them securing a bridgehead across the Taeryong River, allowing the 27th British Commonwealth Brigade to continue its advance towards the Yalu River. KPA casualties included 100 killed and 350 captured, while the Australian losses, which included their first battle fatalities of the war in Korea, were eight killed and 22 wounded. The dead were subsequently interred in a Christian churchyard in Pakchon and were later moved to a cemetery in Pyongyang. Among those captured by the Australians was at least one Chinese soldier, and although the significance of this was not recognised at the time it was undoubtedly a sign of events that would later alter the course of the war. Indeed, during the last weeks of October the Chinese had moved 18 divisions of the People's Volunteer Army across the Yalu River under the overall command of Marshal Peng Dehuai. Undetected by US and South Korean intelligence, the 13th Army Group crossed the border on 16 October and penetrated up to 100 kilometres (62 mi) into North Korea.

=== Subsequent operations ===
Meanwhile, on 27 October the Middlesex continued the brigade's advance, and was involved in a sharp fight in the hills west of the river near the village of Yongsong-ni, killing 35 KPA and capturing 80 prisoners, while American aircraft destroyed 10 KPA T-34 tanks and two SU-76 self-propelled guns. The following day the Argylls took over as the lead battalion. Intelligence indicated that the British and Australians were facing the KPA 17th Tank Brigade, equipped with 20 tanks, and although the KPA had suffered heavy casualties during the previous fighting on the Taeryong River, Coad was now forced to adopt more cautious tactics as a result, advancing in shorter bounds and clearing high points en route. With the war considered all but over the 27th British Commonwealth Brigade continued to pursue the KPA towards Chongju over the next three days; however, the advance increasingly encountered strong resistance from KPA infantry dug-in with tanks and self-propelled guns in support as they approached the Yalu River on the Manchurian border.

3 RAR took over as lead battalion of the brigade on 29 October, 6 kilometres (3.7 mi) from Chongju. That morning a spotter aircraft reported a large KPA formation consisting of a battalion-sized force of 500–600 infantry supported by several tanks and at least two self-propelled guns, positioned on a thickly wooded ridgeline around Chongju. The Battle of Chongju ensued as the Australians dislodged the strong KPA armoured force and then defended their positions against KPA counterattacks during the evening.

== Notes ==
Footnotes

Citations
