= Archer Denness =

Australian Army officer

Archer Paterson Denness
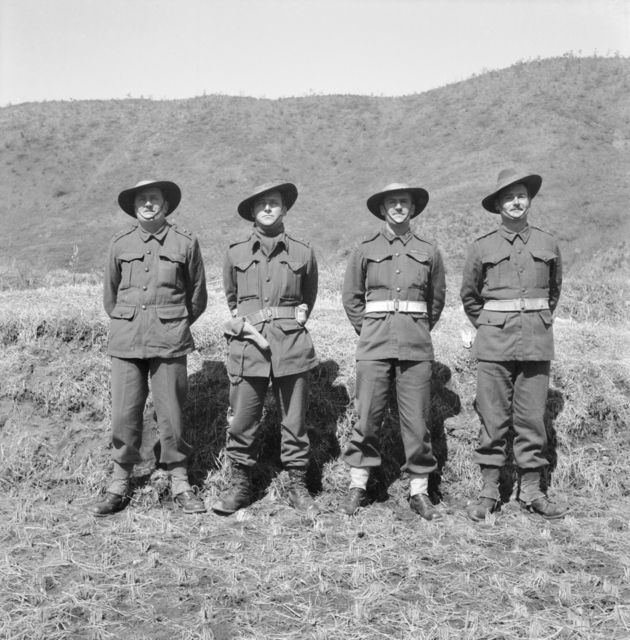
- Four officers of Support Company, 3rd Battalion, The Royal Australian Regiment (3RAR). (left to right): Lieutenant Kevin Innes-Kerr; Lieutenant C. Evans; Major Archer Paterson Denness MC, the company commander; Captain P.H. Bennett.
- Born: 26 December 1914; Fremantle, Western Australia
- Died: 12 September 1997 (aged 82); Temora, New South Wales
- Military career
- Allegiance: Australia
- Branch: Australian Army
- Service years: 1940–1960
- Rank: Major
- Nickname: Armour Piercing Archie
- Conflicts: World War II; Korean War
- Awards: Military Cross

Major Archer Paterson Denness MC, (26 December 1914 – 12 September 1997) was an Australian Army officer who served during the Second World War and the Korean War.

== Personal life ==
Denness was born 26 December 1914 in Fremantle, Western Australia. He married Jessie Elma Brown on 23 November 1946 at Orange, New South Wales. She was born 12 August 1916, Gunnedah or Coonabarabran, New South Wales and was an Army Nurse during the Second World War. The couple had three children, (Helen, Ian and Janice), and 11 grandchildren. Archer died in Temora, New South Wales on 12 September 1997, and Jessie on 13 April 2006.

== Military career ==
Following the outbreak of the Second World War Denness enlisted in the Second Australian Imperial Force in 1940, listing his pre-service occupation as a butcher. In 1941, after undertaking officer training, he was commissioned with the rank of lieutenant and assigned to the 2/32nd Battalion, of the 9th Division, serving with them during the North African campaign and then later in New Guinea after they were brought back to fight against the Japanese. In 1944 he received a Mentioned in Despatches for his service while deployed.

Following the end of the war, Denness transferred to the 66th Battalion and deployed to Japan as part of the British Commonwealth Occupation Force, where he commanded the battalion's 'B' Company, carrying out a number of operations including a search raid on the village of Kinoe where Denness' company discovered a contraband smuggling vessel. In 1948, however, he returned to Australia and after being discharged on 26 May, he was placed on the Reserve of Officers list.

Following the outbreak of the Korean War, Denness returned to the active list and was assigned to the 3rd Battalion, Royal Australian Regiment. While in command of 'C' Company he took part in the Battle of Yongju in Korea, for which he was later awarded the Military Cross. In July 1951, Denness briefly commanded 3RAR between the departure of Lieutenant Colonel Bruce Ferguson and the arrival of the new commanding officer, Lieutenant Colonel Frank Hassett.

He retired in 1960.

== Military Cross citation ==
DENNESS, Archer Patterson, Captain (2/400335),
3rd Battalion, Royal Australian Regiment, 1950

On 22 October 1950, Captain Denness commanded C Company which was the advance guard during a drive north from Yongu in North Korea to link with elements of 11 US Airborne Division some three miles to the north. On reaching a position approximately one mile from the Airborne Division, his company came under heavy rifle and machine-gun fire from a wooded ridge to his front and right flank. Captain Denness quickly organised an attack on the position. As this attack was about to be launched, his company came under more machine-gun fire and rifle fire from approximately forty enemy entrenched in an orchard to his left flank. Despite heavy fire from three sides, Captain Denness resolutely pressed home his original attack, accounting for seventy-five enemy dead. As the attack progressed, his company came under further heavy fire from a position 400 yards to the north. Again Captain Denness quickly launched an attack, killing forty enemy soldiers. During this engagement, which lasted for two hours, his company killed 130 enemy for the loss of three wounded. Captain Denness's task was the more difficult as the proximity of elements of 11 US Airborne Division precluded the use of artillery or mortar fire. Throughout this bitter engagement, Captain Denness was constantly under heavy fire and showed little regard for his personal safety. His calm, resolute action was an inspiration to the entire company and ensured an early junction with the forward elements of 11 US Airborne Division who were in desperate need of support.
