= William Scott-Moncrieff =

Brigadier-General William Scott-Moncrieff
- Born: 15 June 1858; London, England
- Died: 28 June 1915 (aged 57); Gallipoli, Ottoman Empire

Brigadier-General William Scott-Moncrieff (June 1858 – 28 June 1915) was a British Army officer. He was killed during the Gallipoli campaign while commanding the 156th (Scottish Rifles) Brigade.

== Military career ==
Born in London on 15 June 1858, the son of Rev. Canon Scott-Moncrieff, William Scott-Moncrieff was educated at Wimbledon College.

His military career began on 1 May 1878 when, after graduating from the Royal Military College, Sandhurst, he was commissioned as a second lieutenant into the 57th Regiment of Foot, later the Middlesex Regiment.

He was promoted to lieutenant in March 1880, to captain in December 1885 to major on 11 December 1895, to brevet colonel in February 1907, and, after being placed on half-pay after commanding a battalion on 17 February 1908, to colonel on 7 November 1908.

He was promoted to temporary brigadier general in August 1914 and succeeded Brigadier General Steuart Hare in command of the Scottish Rifles Brigade, Lowland Division, in February 1915.
