= 27th Infantry Brigade (United Kingdom) =

British Army unit which fought in WWI, WWII, and the Korean War

27th Infantry Brigade 27th British Commonwealth Brigade 27th Brigade
- Active: 1914–1919; 1939–1945; 1948–1951
- Country: United Kingdom 1939–1951 1950–1951: Canada; Australia; New Zealand artillery (British Raj) Indian medical personnel
- Allegiance: (British Empire) British Commonwealth 1939–1951; United Nations 1950–1951
- Branch: British Army
- Type: Infantry
- Size: Brigade
- Engagements: Second World War; Korean War

Commanders
- Notable commanders: Brigadier Basil Aubrey Coad

The 27th Infantry Brigade was an infantry brigade of the British Army that saw service in the First World War, the Second World War, and the Korean War. In Korea, the brigade was known as 27th British Commonwealth Brigade due to the addition of Canadian, Australian, New Zealand and Indian units.

== Unit history ==
=== First World War ===
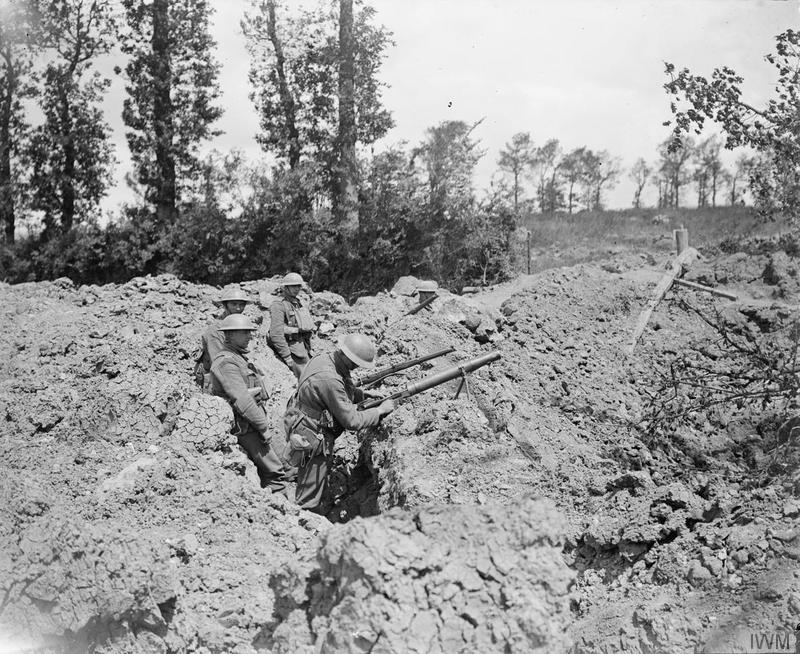
Men of the 12th (Service) Battalion, Royal Scots manning the lip of a mine crater at Meteren, 23 June 1918.

It was originally formed in August 1914 as the 27th Brigade and was part of the 9th (Scottish) Division, the first of the Kitchener's Army divisions raised from volunteers by Lord Kitchener to serve on the Western Front during the First World War. It was originally composed of the 11th and 12th (Service) Battalions of the Royal Scots, 6th (Service) Battalion Royal Scots Fusiliers and the 10th (Service) Battalion Argyll and Sutherland Highlanders (Princess Louise's).

=== Second World War ===
In 1939 this brigade was reformed, as the 27th Infantry Brigade, in the Territorial Army as part of the 9th (Highland) Infantry Division, a 2nd Line duplicate of the 51st (Highland) Infantry Division. When the 51st (Highland) Division surrendered during the Battle of France in June 1940 the 9th (Highland) Infantry Division was redesignated as the 51st (Highland) Infantry Division to make up its loss. Due to this, the 27th Infantry Brigade became the 153rd Infantry Brigade and served with the 51st (Highland) Infantry Division in North Africa, Sicily, Italy, and North-West Europe from 1942 to 1945.

=== Post Second World War ===
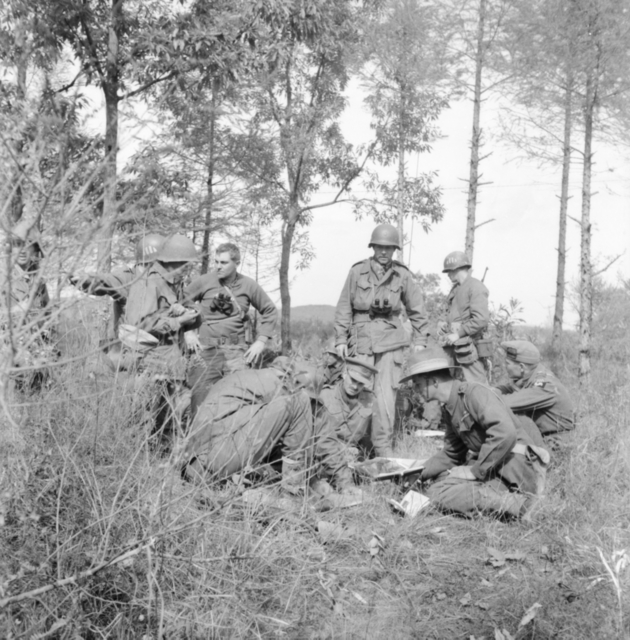
An "orders group" of battalion commanders of the 27th British Commonwealth Infantry Brigade in Korea on 22 Oct 1950, following the Battle of Yongju. In the foreground, seated left and leaning forward, is Brigadier Basil Aubrey Coad. Behind them are officers of the 3rd Battalion, 187th Airborne Infantry Regiment of the US Army, who had just been extricated by the 3rd Battalion, Royal Australian Regiment.

The brigade was re-formed in 1948 and sent out to Hong Kong, but was then sent on to Korea at the outbreak of the Korean War, where Major Kenneth Muir of the Argylls was awarded the Victoria Cross in September 1950.

27th Infantry Brigade arrived in Pusan, South Korea on 28 August 1950. Soon after arriving, the brigade was in action, being involved in the defence of the Pusan Perimeter, on 29 August 1950, and the UN offensive to link with the Inchon landings. The brigade was joined in September 1950 by an Australian contingent, 3rd Battalion, Royal Australian Regiment (3 RAR), and in December 1950 by the 2nd Battalion, Princess Patricia's Canadian Light Infantry. At this time the brigade had few of the support units that were a normal feature of other Commonwealth units in Korea, and were always at a disadvantage in this respect, being reliant on US support units.

After further action during the retreat from the Yalu River, the Chinese Winter Offensive (including Third Battle of Seoul in January 1951) and the UN counter-offensive, the brigade was joined by the specially raised 16 Field Regiment Royal New Zealand Artillery in January 1951, and then a Canadian infantry battalion in February. The brigade's final action was the Battle of Kapyong in April 1951, a famous last-stand victory. Both the Argylls and Middlesex Regiment were relieved and the brigade was disbanded, to be replaced by the fully constituted 28th British Commonwealth Infantry Brigade, part of 1st Commonwealth Division.

== Component units ==
=== 1914–1918 ===
- 11th Battalion, Royal Scots
- 12th Battalion, Royal Scots
- 6th Battalion, Royal Scots Fusiliers
- 10th Battalion, Argyll and Sutherland Highlanders

=== 1939–1940 ===
- 5th Battalion, Black Watch
- 7th Battalion, Gordon Highlanders
- 9th Battalion, Gordon Highlanders
- 1st Battalion, Gordon Highlanders

=== 1948 onwards ===
- 1st Battalion, Royal Leicestershire Regiment
- 1st Battalion, Middlesex Regiment (to April 1951)
- 1st Battalion, Argyll and Sutherland Highlanders (to April 1951)
- 2nd Battalion, Princess Patricia's Canadian Light Infantry
- 3rd Battalion, Royal Australian Regiment
- 16th Field Regiment, Royal New Zealand Artillery
- 60th Indian Field Ambulance

== Commanders ==
- 27 August 1914: Brigadier-General William Scott-Moncrieff
- 7 January 1915: Brigadier-General Clarence Dalrymple Bruce
- 26 September 1915: Lieutenant-Colonel Henry Ernest Walshe (acting)
- 14 October 1915: Brigadier-General Henry Ernest Walshe
- 17 March 1916: Brigadier-General Gerald Frederic Trotter
- 2 May 1916: Lieutenant-Colonel W. J. B. Tweedie (acting)
- 6 May 1916: Brigadier-General Spencer William Scrase-Dickens
- 21 October 1916: Brigadier-General Francis Aylmer Maxwell
- 21 September 1917: Lieutenant-Colonel H. D. N. Maclean (acting)
- 23 September 1917: Brigadier-General William Denman Croft
- Brigadier G.T. Gurney
- Brigadier William Fraser
- Brigadier D.A.H. Graham

=== Korean War ===
- Brigadier Basil Aubrey Coad
- Lt Colonel Andrew Morrice Man (acting) 6th December 1950 to 18th December 1950

== Bibliography ==
- Gregory Blaxland, The Regiments Depart: A History of the British Army 1945–70, William Kimber, London, 1971.
- Brian Catchpole: The Korean War ISBN 1-84119-413-1
- Andrew Salmon, Scorched Earth, Black Snow, Britain and Australia in the Korean War, 1950
