= Basil Coad =

British Army general (1906–1980)

Major-General Basil Coad CB CBE DSO* DL
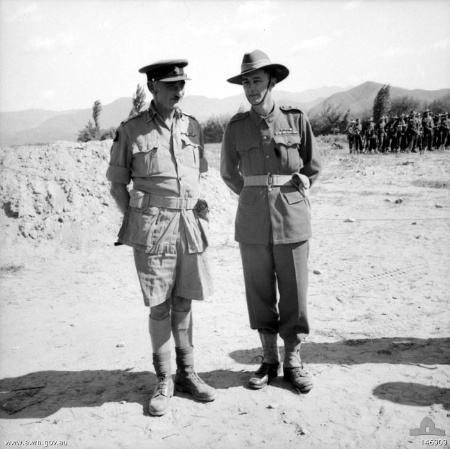
- Coad (left) with Lieutenant-Colonel Charles Green, CO of the 3rd Battalion, Royal Australian Regiment, at Taegu, Korea on 28 September 1950.
- Born: 27 September 1906; Portsmouth, Hampshire, England
- Died: 26 March 1980 (aged 73); Wiltshire, England
- Military career
- Allegiance: United Kingdom
- Branch: British Army
- Service years: 1926–1957
- Rank: Major-General
- Service number: 34667
- Unit: Wiltshire Regiment
- Commands: 2nd Division; 27th British Commonwealth Infantry Brigade; 30th Infantry Brigade; 2nd Battalion, Wiltshire Regiment; 130th Infantry Brigade; 5th Battalion, Dorset Regiment
- Conflicts: Arab revolt in Palestine; Second World War; Korean War
- Awards: Companion of the Order of the Bath; Commander of the Order of the British Empire; Distinguished Service Order & Bar; Officer of the Legion of Merit (United States)
- Other work: Colonel of the Wiltshire Regiment, later the Duke of Edinburgh's Royal Regiment; Deputy Lieutenant of Wiltshire

Major-General Basil Aubrey Coad, CB, CBE, DSO & Bar, DL (27 September 1906 – 26 March 1980) was a senior British Army officer. He held battalion, brigade and divisional commands during the Second World War and immediately after, but is best known as the commander of the 27th British Commonwealth Brigade during the Korean War.

After his involvement in Korea, he held a further divisional command, and then a senior administrative position in the army before retiring. In retirement, he continued his connection with the army, serving as Colonel of his former regiment, and assisting in writing the British official history of the Korean War. He was also appointed a Deputy Lieutenant of Wiltshire.

== Early life and military career ==
Coad was born on 27 September 1906 at Portsmouth, Hampshire. He was educated at Felsted School and Royal Military College, Sandhurst. From Sandhurst he was commissioned into the British Army as a second lieutenant in the Wiltshire Regiment on 4 February 1926. He was soon bound for India to join the 1st Battalion. After a few years' service there he was posted to Shanghai, then one of the treaty ports, in January 1929, promoted to lieutenant on 4 February, and appointed as Deputy Assistant Provost Marshal from December that year.

Coad returned to the United Kingdom in 1934 and was appointed adjutant of the 2nd Battalion, Wiltshires. He served with the battalion in Palestine during the Arab revolt. On 22 January 1937 he was seconded to the 4th Battalion, a Territorial Army (TA) unit, to serve as its adjutant, at the same time he was granted temporary rank as a captain in the TA. He was promoted to substantive captain on 18 March 1938.

== Second World War ==
With the outbreak of the Second World War, Coad was promoted to acting major for service as an instructor in the 43rd (Wessex) Infantry Division, he became a temporary major on 1 February 1940. In January 1941 he was appointed second-in-command of the 2nd Battalion, Wiltshires. By August 1942 he was an acting lieutenant colonel in command of the Battle School of the 43rd Division, now commanded by Major General Ivor Thomas, in Kent. He was then appointed commanding officer of the 5th Battalion, Dorset Regiment at the beginning of 1943. He was promoted substantive major on 4 February 1943.

The 5th Dorsets participated in Operation Overlord (the Normandy Campaign) as part of the 130th Infantry Brigade, 43rd Division. On 10 July 1944, during the opening of Operation Jupiter, the unit was ordered to capture Chateau de Fontaine, near Fontaine-Étoupefour. They successfully captured the chateau, and were then ordered to take a further objective. Coad personally reconnoitred the route across open country, despite heavy machine gun and mortar fire. The attack was launched and the objective taken, but it could not be held. Coad withdrew his two furthest forward companies and prepared the chateau as a defensive position. As a result of his leadership on this occasion Coad was awarded the Distinguished Service Order (DSO) on 19 October 1944. The citation concluded:

Lt Col COAD throughout the day retained complete control of the situation and by his personal example inspired his battalion to carry out all the tasks allotted them magnificently.

The brigade participated in the continued Allied advance from Paris to the Rhine, and in September 1944 was involved in the ill-fated Operation Market Garden. On 7 October 1944, Coad was promoted acting brigadier and given command of the 130th Brigade. A year later he was awarded a Bar to his DSO on 11 October 1945 for his leadership in the intervening period, which covered the Western Allied invasion of Germany. The citation remarked:

Prior to [7 October 1944] the B[riga]de had been "unlucky", several times knocked about, and its only clear cut success had been once before when Brig COAD as a Lt Col, was temporarily in com[man]d. This officer by fearless and indefatigable leadership, has raised the standard of his Bde to a very high level, and has led it through a series of uniformly successful actions, particularly since 1 February 45. [... He] has shown himself to be a fine and determined leader, [...] whose presence in the forward area has so often been an inspiration to all ranks under his command.

After this Coad was promoted war substantive lieutenant colonel (and retained the temporary rank of brigadier). Then, on 28 January 1946 he was given command of the 43rd (Wessex) Infantry Division, now part of the British Army of the Rhine, as an acting major general. He relinquished the command, and reverted to temporary brigadier on 10 March 1946. He returned to 130th Brigade, and then reverted to lieutenant colonel and returned to his own regiment, commanding the 2nd Wiltshires. He was then again made a brigadier and commanded 30th Infantry Brigade, before returning to 2nd Wiltshires again. He was promoted substantive lieutenant colonel on 8 February 1948.

== Korean War ==
After returning to the UK from Germany in August 1948, he was again made a temporary brigadier, and given command of 27th Infantry Brigade. In June 1949, the brigade arrived in Hong Kong as part of Far East Land Forces (FARELF), and was designated United Kingdom Strategic Reserve, theoretically able to deploy anywhere in the world at ten days notice. On 6 April 1950 he was made a substantive colonel. A year after the brigade's arrival in Hong Kong, North Korean forces crossed the de facto border with South Korea, the 38th parallel, triggering the outbreak of the Korean War. On 6 July the British Cabinet decided not to send land forces to Korea. British forces were already heavily committed in Malaya in the developing Malayan Emergency, aid had been promised to the French in Vietnam, and there were fears that the escalating tensions could lead to China threatening Hong Kong.

However, as July wore on the South Koreans and Americans suffered further reverses, and with the Foreign Office pointing out that the UK's standing as a world power, and its relationship with the US, was in danger of being jeopardised, on 25 July the Cabinet resolved to send land forces to Korea. The decision was announced in the House of Commons the following day by the Minister of Defence, Manny Shinwell who said:

None the less, His Majesty's Government have no desire to escape their obligation to play their full part as a member of the United Nations in the restoration of order in Korea. It will not be easy for us to make forces available, but I can tell the House that we are today notifying the Secretary-General of the United Nations that we are prepared to send to that theatre, for use under the orders of the United Nations Commander, an effective land reinforcement which will be a self-contained force including infantry, armour, artillery and engineers, together with the administrative backing required to maintain it.

It was initially envisaged that the British contribution would consist of 29th Infantry Brigade. This was based in the UK, and reservists had to be recalled to bring it up to strength. As the situation Korea continued to worsen, it was decided to send other British forces from closer at hand, and this decision was announced in the Commons on 20 August 1950. Coad's brigade, then consisting of the first battalions of the Middlesex Regiment, Argyll and Sutherland Highlanders and Leicestershire Regiment, plus some supporting services, was selected to form this force. The Leicesters were left in Hong Kong due to the ongoing concern over China's attitude. The brigade had no artillery, and little transport, Coad was told he would have to rely on US support and supplies, including rations. Compounding the difficulties of organising the move to Korea, most of the men had just been given leave after a hard exercise, and were on their way into Hong Kong City for a Friday night out, and would prove hard to retrieve over the weekend. Both battalions were somewhat under strength, and this problem was exacerbated by a government decision that those under 19 should not serve in combat, volunteers were hurriedly drawn from other units in Hong Kong to try to get the battalions up to establishment.

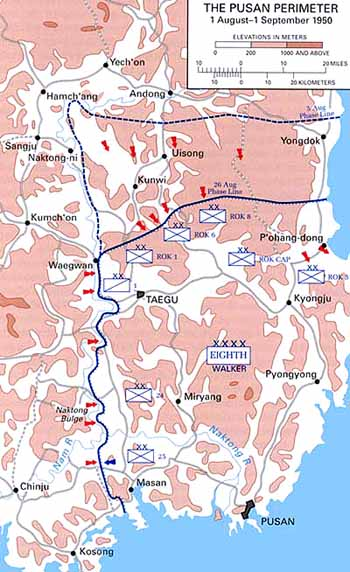
Map of the Pusan Perimeter August–September 1950

Coad flew into Pusan on 27 August 1950, ahead of the rest of the brigade which travelled on the aircraft carrier HMS Unicorn and cruiser HMS Ceylon and arrived in Korea on 29 August, just nine days after the decision to deploy them was officially announced. They joined the defence of the Pusan Perimeter. One battalion went into action on 3 September, with the brigade as a whole being given its own section of the front line along the Naktong River, south-west of Taegu on 5 September. The brigade's first casualties came on 6 September, Private Reginald Streeter of the Middlesexes and Captain Neil Buchanan and his batman, Private Tam Taylor, of the Argylls.

With the pressure somewhat relieved following the amphibious landings at Inchon on 15 September, the brigade joined the subsequent breakout from Pusan, and then covered the flank of the main US advance aimed at retaking Seoul. On 22 September the brigade crossed the Naktong by a hurriedly constructed bridge that could only be walked over in single file. To secure the road on the other side, the brigade, now attached to 24th Infantry Division (United States), was ordered to take high ground on either side. To the right of the road were "Plum Pudding Hill" (their name for it), three miles south of Songju, and a 900-foot high feature which later became known as Middlesex Hill. The Middlesexes, supported by two American tanks, took Plum Pudding at the point of the bayonet, and then took Middlesex Hill. Total casualties were one officer and six other ranks killed and seven wounded. Now the brigade had to take the high ground on the left of the road. Early on 23 September the Argylls began the Battle of Hill 282, suffering the heaviest casualties so far as a result of both heavy fighting with North Korean force and a communications failure which led to an attack by US aircraft in a "friendly-fire" incident. The Argylls' second in command, Major Kenneth Muir was awarded a posthumous Victoria Cross for his efforts (ultimately unsuccessful) to hold the position. In total the Argylls suffered two officers and eleven other ranks dead, four officers and seventy OR wounded, and two missing, about forty per cent of these casualties being from the US airstrike. Despite this setback the brigade participated in the capture of Songju on 24 September, working with 1st Battalion, 19th Infantry Regiment (United States). The brigade was then detached from 24th Division, and placed under the command of Eighth United States Army.

On 28 September 3rd Battalion, Royal Australian Regiment arrived in Korea and they were attached to the brigade to bring it back up to strength. The Australians had been on occupation duties in Japan, and with just two weeks training were thrown into the fighting in Korea. The brigade was now retitled 27th British Commonwealth Brigade.

With the status quo ante bellum now restored, the Commander-in-Chief of UN Forces, Douglas MacArthur offered surrender terms, but these were rejected, so the UN forces began their advance into North Korea.

== Later career and retirement ==
He commanded 2nd Division from 1951 to 1954, then was President of the Regular Commissions Board from 1954 to 1957, when he retired.

Military offices
Preceded by Colin Callander	GOC 2nd Division; 1951–1954	Succeeded by John Wilsey
Honorary titles
Preceded by ??	Colonel of the Wiltshire Regiment; 1953–1959	Succeeded by Regiment consolidated to form the Duke of Edinburgh's Royal Regiment
