= Taeryong River =

River in North Korea

- Hangul: 대령강
- Hanja: 大寧江
- RR: Daeryeonggang
- MR: Taeryŏnggang

Taeryong River (Korean: 대령강) is a river of North Korea. The river is a tributary of the Ch'ongch'on River.

== See also ==
- Rivers of Korea
