= Members of 5 Platoon, B Company, 7th Battalion, The Royal Australian Regiment, 26 August 1967 =

Royal Australian

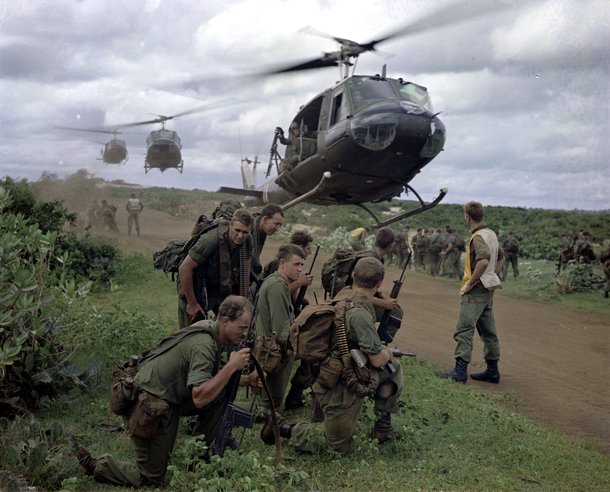
- Artist: Mike Coleridge
- Year: 1967
- Type: Colour – Film – original negative
- Location: Australian War Memorial; Canberra
- Website: https://www.awm.gov.au/collection/C195204

Members of 5 Platoon, B Company, 7th Battalion, The Royal Australian Regiment, 26 August 1967 is a 1967 photograph by Australian military photographer Mike Coleridge. The photograph, taken near the village of Phước Hải in the-then Phước Tuy Province of South Vietnam, depicts a group of Australian Army soldiers waiting to board a Bell UH-1 Iroquois about to land.

The photograph has become an enduring icon of Australia's involvement in the Vietnam War. Recognising this, the photograph was selected to be etched on the Vietnam Forces National Memorial on Anzac Parade in Canberra.

== Circumstances ==
The photograph was taken on 26 August 1967, during Operation Ulmarra. The operation conducted by the 7th Battalion, The Royal Australian Regiment, and the 2nd Battalion, The Royal Australian Regiment, was a cordon-and-search operation in Phước Hải, a coastal township in the then Phuoc Tuy Province of South Vietnam.

Operation Ulmarra formed part of a series of cordon-and-search operations conducted by the 1st Australian Task Force in August 1967 across several key villages in the province. These operations were intended to disrupt Viet Cong infrastructure, demonstrate Allied control of populated areas, and improve security ahead of the South Vietnamese national elections scheduled for September 1967.

During the operation, Australian troops entered and searched the village, screening the inhabitants and examining houses and fishing facilities for weapons, supplies, or evidence of insurgent activity. Although little direct evidence of a Viet Cong presence was discovered, more than twenty suspects, sympathisers, and draft evaders were detained during the search.

The photograph features Private Peter Capp (kneeling), Private Bob Fennell (leaning over, facing camera, with an ammunition belt for an M60 machine gun slung over his shoulder), Corporal Bob D'Arcy (partly obscured behind Fennell); Private Neal Hasted (centre, front), Private Ian Jury (partly obscured, centre, rear, holding rifle); Private Colin Barnett (front, right, M60 ammunition belt on back, back of head to camera), Lance Corporal Stan Whitford (partly obscured behind Barnett), and the helicopter marshal at right is Private John Raymond Gould.

The men are equipped in what the Australian Army described as “patrol order”, the standard load carried by infantry during short operations. This typically included personal weapons such as the L1A1 Self-Loading Rifle, ammunition, water, rations, webbing equipment, and minimal additional gear appropriate for a one-day operation. The relatively light equipment reflected the nature of the mission, which was intended to be completed within a single day before the platoon returned to base by helicopter.

== Photographer ==
The photograph was taken by Sergeant Michael Coleridge, serving in a public relations role with the Australian Army. Coleridge enlisted in 1957 and served in the Royal Australian Artillery in the Malayan Emergency.

While serving in Malaya Coleridge, using his own equipment, privately made films for the British Army. This work saw the Australian Army assign him a position as a public relations photographer in 1963. Coleridge was posted to Vietnam in 1966. Often exposing himself to danger, Coleridge recorded the tours of 5RAR, 6RAR and 7RAR in Vietnam. Coleridge worked relatively independently and was required to construct his own darkroom and even sometimes purchase his own film.

Coleridge was born in Slovenia in 1933. Coleridge and his mother moved to Austria at the end of World War II, after the breakdown of his parents' marriage. When he was 16, he migrated to Australia on his own where he worked as a labourer, first in Sydney and later in rural New South Wales. Coleridge, chasing adventure, then moved to the Northern Territory where his obtained a private pilot licence. Coleridge joined the Australian Army hoping for a role as a pilot. However his lack of formal education saw this path blocked and he was assigned to an artillery unit.

Coleridge discharged himself from the Australian Army on return to Australia in 1967 to support his family in Australia. He worked as a photographer for the Truth, a Melbourne newspaper for a period. He later worked as a cane train driver in Queensland and a gold miner in Western Australia before settling in Canberra where he worked for a while as an attendant at the Australian War Memorial. Later in life he grew walnuts and raised cattle on farms around the Canberra region. He died in 2012 from complications after a fall while suffering from lung cancer.

== Cultural impact ==
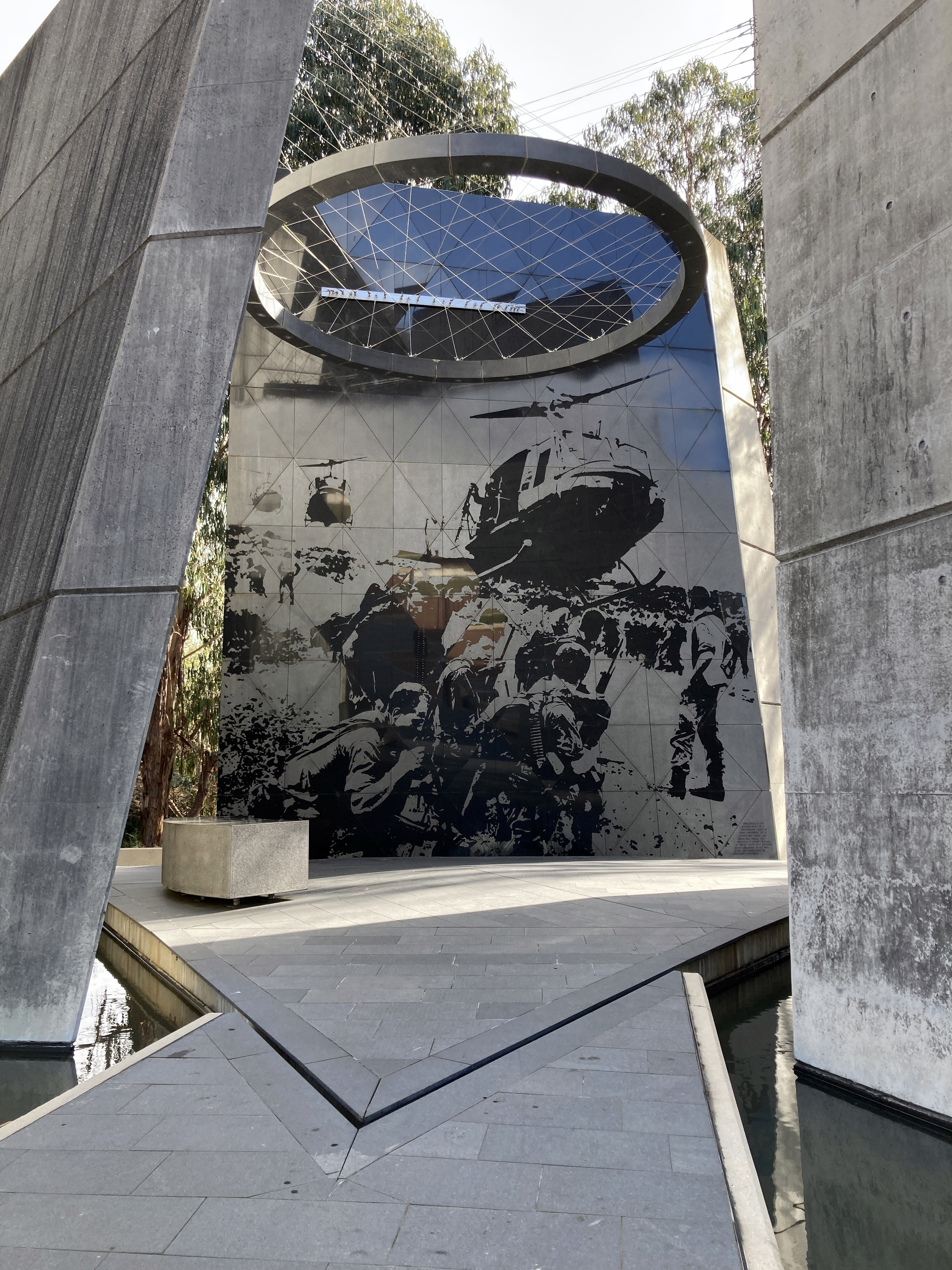
The image reproduced on the Australian Vietnam Forces National Memorial in Canberra

Many years after the event, Peter Capp stated that he would "prefer the picture to represent everyone who fought in the Vietnam War, not just the select few in the photo".

Peter Harris remembered the first time he saw the photograph "I was walking through Sydney only matter of months after returning and I saw it in a framed picture in David Jones". He later saw the image used on "everything from biscuit tins to port jugs".

Australia Post included the photograph on a stamp for a series issued in 2016 commemorating Australia's contribution to the Vietnam War.
