= 7th Battalion, Royal Australian Regiment =

Australian Army infantry battalion

- Badge of the Royal Australian Regiment
- Active: 1965–1973; 2007–2024
- Country: Australia
- Branch: Australian Army
- Type: Mechanised infantry
- Part of: 9th Brigade
- Garrison/HQ: RAAF Base Edinburgh, Adelaide
- Nicknames: The Pigs; Porky Seven
- Motto: Duty First
- Colours: Maroon
- March: Quick – Australaise (band); Cock o' the North (pipes and drums); Slow – My Home
- Mascot: Pig
- Engagements: Vietnam War: Battle of Suoi Chau Pha; Operation Coburg; War in Afghanistan
- Decorations: Gallantry Cross Unit Citation (South Vietnam)

Commanders
- Current commander: Lieutenant Colonel Levon Lambert

Insignia
- Unit colour patch
- Tartan: Gordon (pipes and drums)

The 7th Battalion, Royal Australian Regiment (7 RAR) was a regular infantry battalion of the Australian Army. It was originally raised in 1965 as part of Australia's commitment to the Vietnam War and it eventually served two tours in Vietnam in 1967 and 1971. In 1973, following Australia's withdrawal from the conflict, the battalion was amalgamated with the 5th Battalion, Royal Australian Regiment to form the 5th/7th Battalion, Royal Australian Regiment (5/7 RAR). The battalion was re-linked with the 5th Battalion to reraise the 5th/7th Battalion, Royal Australian Regiment in December 2024.

These two units remained linked until 2007, during which time they served together in the mechanised infantry role in East Timor and Iraq. In December 2006 – early January 2007, 5/7 RAR was delinked and 7 RAR was re-raised. In January 2009, 7 RAR achieved operational status, a year ahead of schedule. The battalion deployed to Afghanistan as part of Operation Slipper in 2008–09 and 2012–13. Following its return in 2013 it was converted into a standard infantry battalion. As of late October 2022 it forms part of the 9th "Heavy" Brigade (Australia) and is based at RAAF Base Edinburgh in Adelaide with the 1st Armoured Regiment.

== History ==
=== Formation ===
In late 1964, the South Vietnamese government requested increased military assistance from Australia to help stop the Vietcong (VC) insurgency. Following talks with the United States in early 1965, the Australian government decided to increase its commitment to the war in Vietnam, offering to send an infantry battalion to bolster the Australian Army Training Team Vietnam that had been in South Vietnam since 1962. To meet this requirement, the decision was made to expand the Royal Australian Regiment, the Australian Army's regular infantry force, to nine battalions by 1965, using experienced regulars and national servicemen.

As a part of this expansion, the 7th Battalion, Royal Australian Regiment, was raised on 1 September 1965 at Puckapunyal in Victoria, under the command of Lieutenant Colonel Eric Smith. The battalion drew the majority of its experienced personnel from the 3rd Battalion, Royal Australian Regiment (3 RAR), which had been serving in Malaysia as part of Australia's involvement in the Indonesia–Malaysia confrontation. The rest of 7 RAR's personnel were national serviceman from the second intake. Due to the large numbers of national servicemen that the battalion received from the outset, upon formation 7 RAR's average age was estimated at only 22 years. A number of these national servicemen went on to command sections as non-commissioned officers or platoons as newly commissioned subalterns. At this time the battalion adopted a pig as its mascot, following an observation by the commanding officer about the state of the soldiers' mess at Puckapunyal.

In June 1966, after the battalion had completed a series of intensive training exercises, 7 RAR was considered operationally deployable. At this time, 100 men were transferred from the battalion to units serving in South Vietnam, to provide reinforcements. After this, further training was undertaken at the Jungle Training Centre at Canungra, Queensland and later in the year, 7 RAR took part in "Exercise Barra Winga" around Shoalwater Bay.

=== Vietnam ===
==== First tour ====
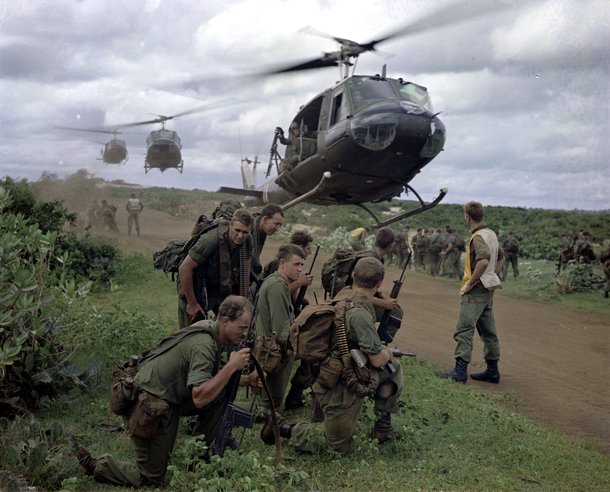
Members of 5 Platoon, B Company, 7th Battalion, The Royal Australian Regiment, 26 August 1967, an iconic photograph by Mike Coleridge featuring 7 RAR soldiers preparing to board US Army helicopters at the conclusion of an operation in August 1967. The photograph is now etched on the Vietnam Forces National Memorial.

In April 1967, 7 RAR embarked upon HMAS Sydney, bound for South Vietnam. Upon arrival they relieved the 5th Battalion, Royal Australian Regiment (5 RAR). By this time, the single Australian battalion that had originally been committed had been replaced by the 1st Australian Task Force (1 ATF), consisting of two infantry battalions and various supporting units, based in Phuoc Tuy province. Upon arrival the battalion joined the 6th Battalion, Royal Australian Regiment (6 RAR) at 1 ATF's base at Nui Dat, however, the following month 6 RAR was replaced by the 2nd Battalion, Royal Australian Regiment (2 RAR) and it was with 2 RAR that the battalion served out its first year-long tour of duty in South Vietnam.

Over the course of those 12 months, 7 RAR took part in 26 battalion-level operations, as well as numerous small unit actions. (Note: There is some discrepancy about this figure among the sources. The Annex G to Chapter 6 of the Royal Australian Regiment Standing Orders provides the figure of 30 battalion-level operations.) Initially, 7 RAR undertook security operations around Nui Dat as well as carrying out a few search and destroy taskings at a local level, however, their first major operation saw them take up a blocking position near Xuyen Moc in support of US and South Vietnamese forces who advanced through the May Tao mountains in an effort to locate the VC 275th Regiment and drive them towards 7 RAR's position. Ultimately, however, this operation failed as the VC unit was not located.

In August 1967 the battalion was tasked to undertake an independent search and destroy operation to the north-west of Nui Dat, in the Hat Dich area. This operation, codenamed Operation Ballarat, led to the Battle of Suoi Chau Pha when 'A' Company, under Major Ewart O'Donnell fought an encounter battle with a reinforced VC company from the 3rd Battalion, 274th Regiment. Five Australians were killed during the fighting, while another died of wounds later, and 19 others were wounded. It is believed that the VC suffered over 200 casualties in the battle, largely from supporting artillery and mortars.

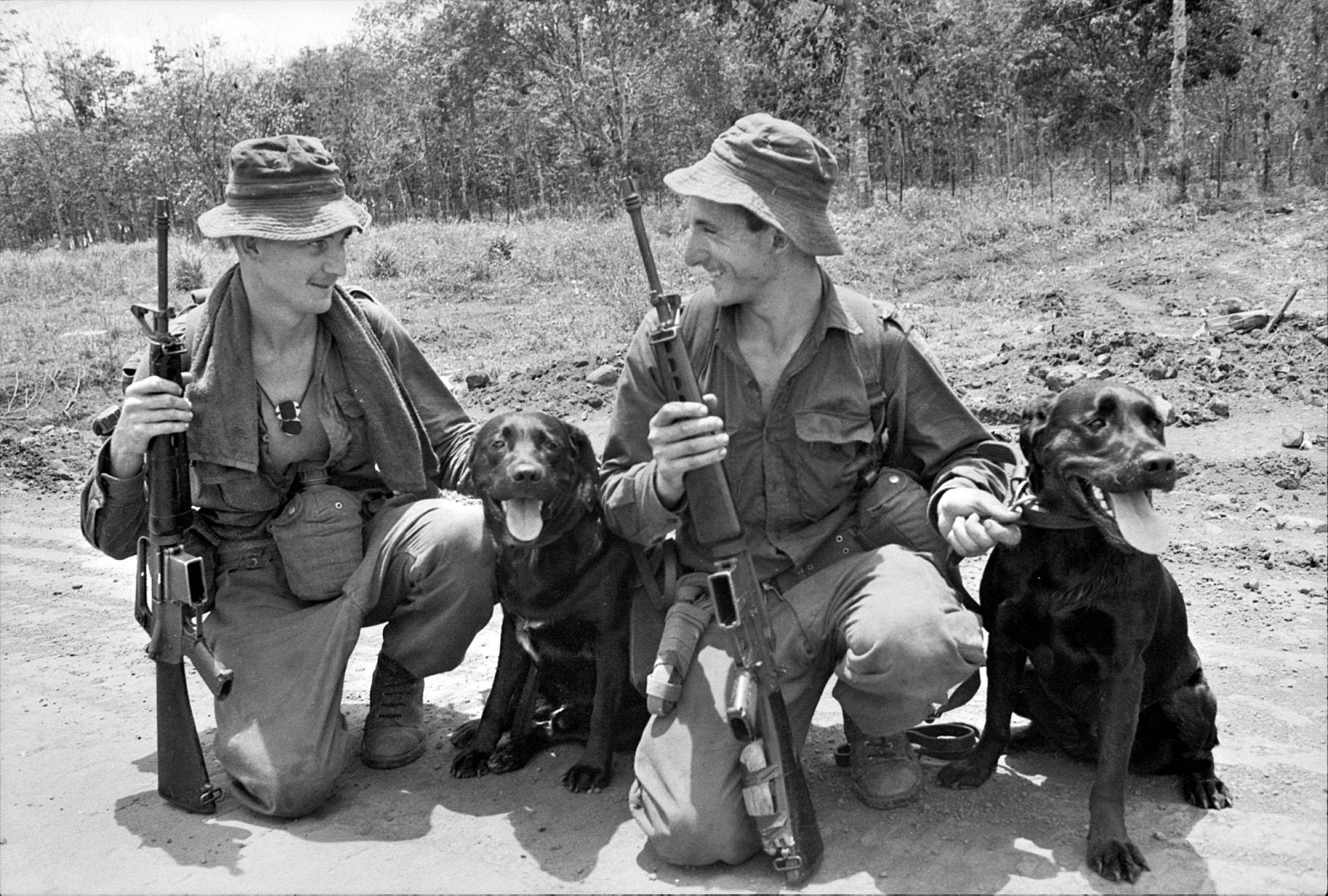
7 RAR tracker dogs and their handlers in South Vietnam, 1967

Throughout August and September 7 RAR took part in resettlement operations around Xa Bang. Later in September, the battalion lost a large number of its national servicemen who, having completed their two-year obligation, were rotated back to Australia for discharge. The following month they took part in an Australian, US and South Vietnamese Operation Santa Fe which was launched in the May Tao Secret Zone in an attempt to find the VC 5th Division. After this they undertook search and destroy operations around Nui Dat, however contact with the VC during this time was limited. In December 1967, 1 ATF was expanded to a brigade-group with the arrival of a third infantry battalion, 3 RAR, and a quantity of Centurion tanks. Between 24 January and 1 March 1968, 7 RAR deployed to Bien Hoa–Long Khanh border along with 2 RAR and subsequently took part in Operation Coburg during the Tet Offensive.

On 9 April 1968, 7 RAR was relieved by 1 RAR and subsequently rotated back to Australia. Upon arrival in Sydney, the battalion was welcomed home by a large crowd and conducted a march through the streets. Throughout their deployment over 1,180 men had served in the battalion's ranks, of whom 16 had been killed and 124 wounded. Members of the battalion received the following decorations: one Distinguished Service Order (DSO), two Members of Order of the British Empire (MBEs), two Military Crosses (MCs), two Distinguished Conduct Medals (DCMs), three Military Medals (MMs) and 14 Mentions in Despatches (MIDs).

==== Second tour ====
Following 7 RAR's return to Australia it was based at Finschhafen Lines, at Holsworthy, New South Wales. It was there, on 6 October 1968, that the battalion finally received its Queen's and Regimental Colours in a ceremony presided over by the Governor of New South Wales, Sir Roden Cutler. Following this the battalion undertook further training in preparation for its second tour of duty in South Vietnam, which came in early 1970. They arrived in country in February under the command of Lieutenant Colonel Ronald Grey, replacing 5 RAR. They arrived amidst an effort to pacify Phuoc Tuy. This effort involved 7 RAR in almost continuous operations, in an attempt to keep the VC off balance and separate them from the civilian population. During April and May 1970, 7 RAR took part in the task force level Operation Concrete which took place around Xuyen Moc with the aim of destroying the VC D445 Battalion.

The battalion's role in Concrete was to operate in the Tan Ru region, carrying out a reconnaissance-in-force followed by ambush operations. Only three companies were available for wider operations, however, as 'C' Company was detached to provide training to the Army of the Republic of Vietnam 18th Division, although it undertook local patrols and ambushes. Instead of being inserted by helicopter, the decision was made for the companies to deploy on foot and by Armoured Personnel Carrier. On 20 April, one of 'B' Company's platoons contacted a small VC force and engaged them in a brief firefight that left one VC dead. Two days later, in concert with artillery and Centurion tanks, 'B' Company was involved in capturing a bunker complex.

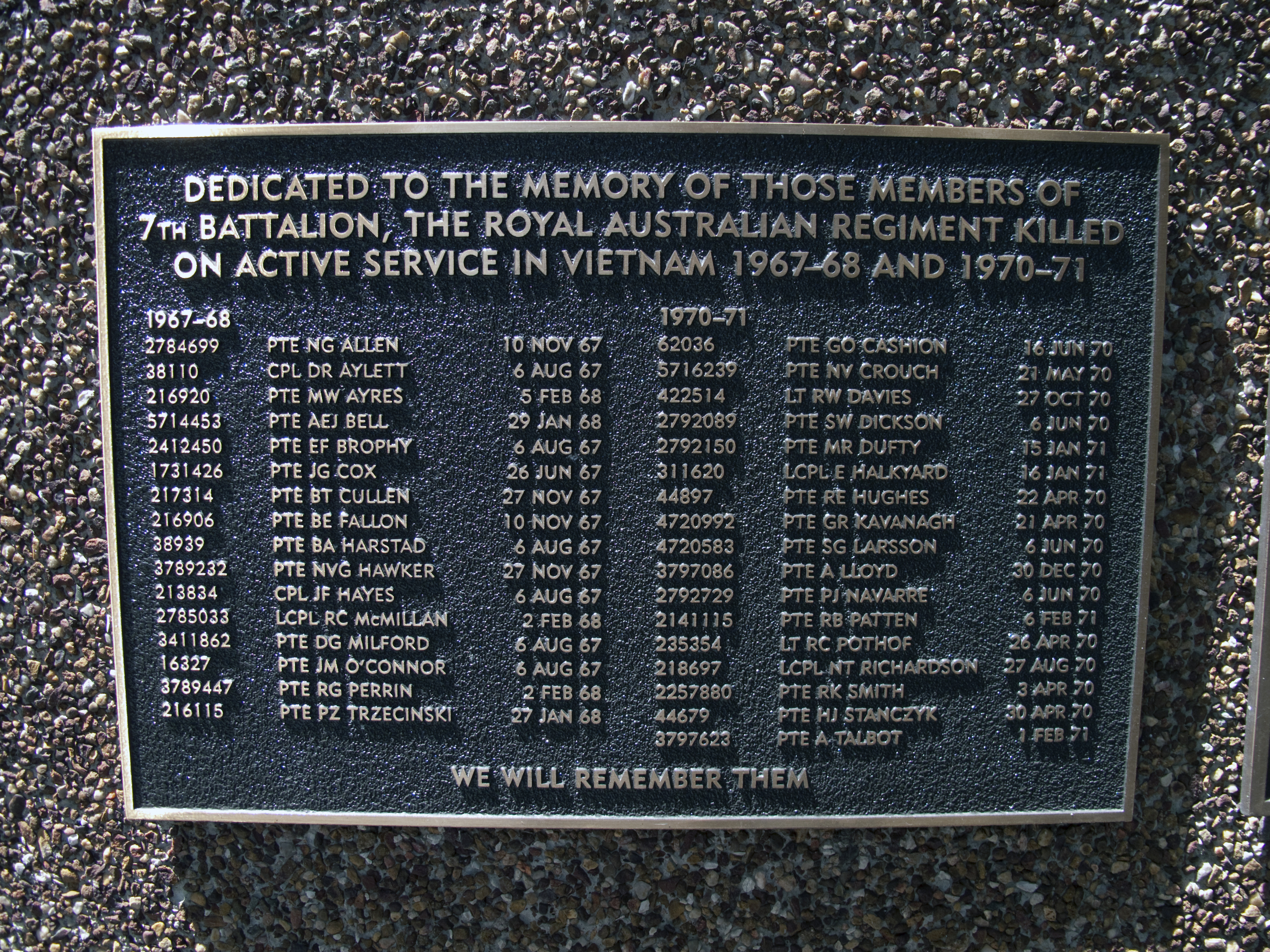
A memorial plaque for members of 7 RAR killed in Vietnam 1967–68 and 1970–71. Shown at Regimental Square, Sydney.

Throughout June 1970 and February 1971, 1 ATF undertook a four-phased pacification operation known as Cung Chung in concert with South Vietnamese forces. This involved extensive patrolling, ambush and cordon and search operations. During one such operation on the night of 30 December 1970 Headquarters 'B' Company, 7 RAR and four APCs from 3rd Cavalry Regiment were engaged by a large group of VC. The VC assaulted the Australians four times before being repelled by heavy fire from the M113s. The following morning a clearing patrol found 21 bodies and a large quantity of weapons and ammunition. Intelligence later assessed that a company from D445 Battalion had been destroyed.

On 25 February 1971, 3 RAR relieved 7 RAR, and the battalion returned to Sydney, arriving there on 10 March 1971. For its second tour, members of 7 RAR received the following decorations: one DSO, two MBEs, two MCs, two MMs, five MIDs and one British Empire Medal. Casualties included 17 killed and 89 wounded, many of them caused by mines lifted by the VC from the controversial barrier minefield laid previously by the Australians at Dat Do. Over the course of its two deployments, over 2,400 men served with 7 RAR of which 33 were killed and 220 wounded.

=== Linking with the 5th Battalion ===
Upon return to Australia the battalion commenced the process of reforming under the command of Lieutenant Colonel Ian Mackay, in preparation for an expected third tour of South Vietnam in mid-1972. However, in December 1971, 1 ATF was withdrawn from South Vietnam as part of a phased withdrawal of Australian personnel from the country. This decision, coupled with the subsequent abolition of conscription following the election of the Whitlam government and a shift in Australian defence policy towards an emphasis on the defence of mainland Australia, resulted in the need to reduce the size of the Australian Army.

To implement this it was decided to amalgamate a number of infantry battalions. 7 RAR was one of these, and on 3 December 1973 the battalion was linked with 5 RAR to form the 5th/7th Battalion, Royal Australian Regiment at a ceremony conducted at Tobruk Lines, Holsworthy. The battalion's last commanding officer, Lieutenant Colonel Paul Greenhalgh, who had assumed command of 7 RAR on 19 March 1973, became the first commanding officer of the new battalion.

=== Mechanisation ===
The M113 armoured personnel carrier was first introduced in 1976, and 5/7 RAR officially adopted the "mechanised" suffix in June 1984 and has been a significant part of the battalion's heritage ever since. The unit deployed on operational service with the vehicles during INTERFET in East Timor in 1999 and maintained a QRF presence with M113s in Timor-Leste from 2006 to 2009. The most recent M113AS4 Armoured Personnel Carriers were introduced on 15 November 2007. The ceremonial handover took place at Robertson Barracks, where one of the vehicles on display was fitted with extra armour, spall curtains and track shrouds.

=== Re-raised ===
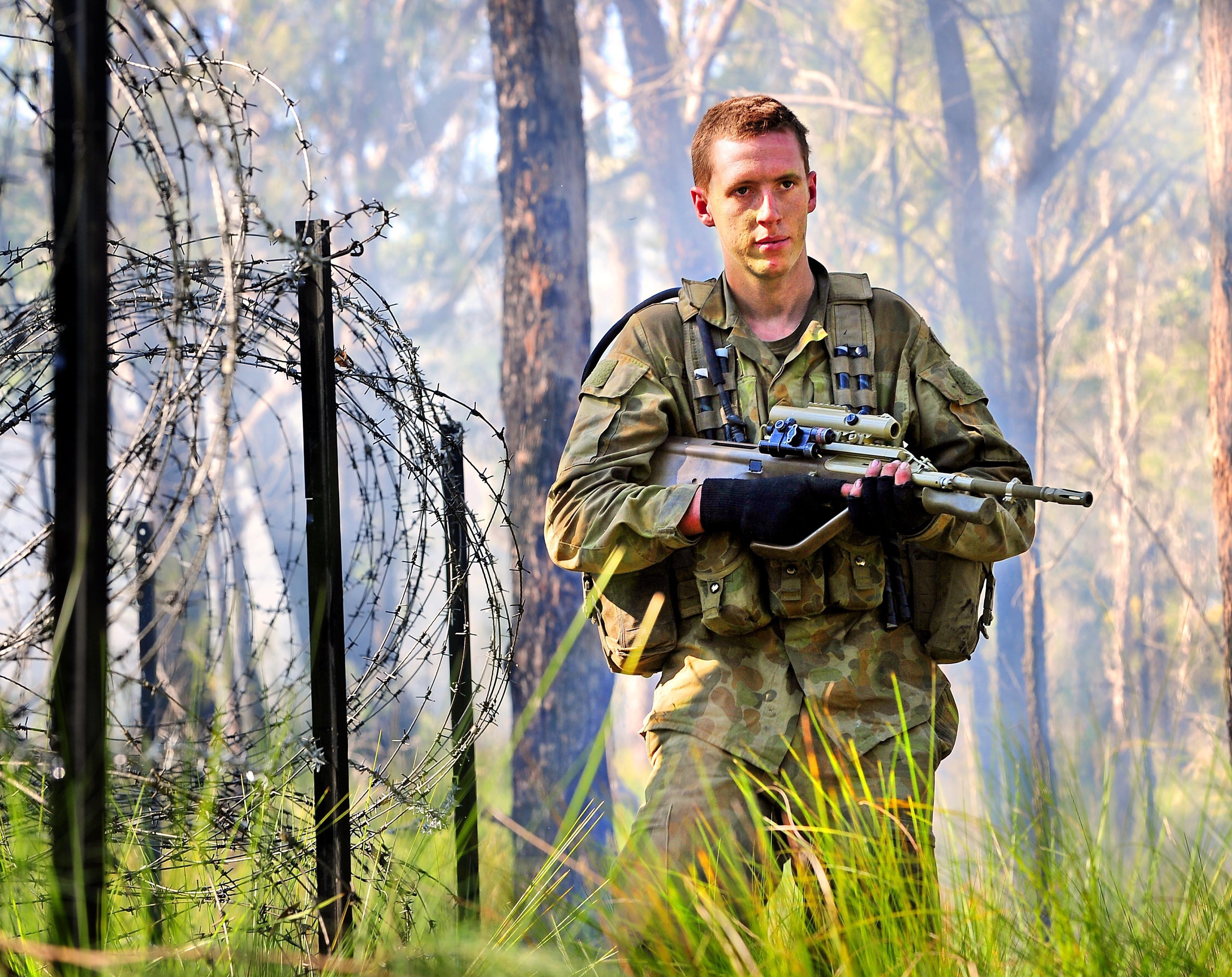
A 7RAR soldier on exercise at Shoalwater Bay 2011

On 24 August 2006, Prime Minister John Howard announced that there would be an expansion of the Australian regular infantry by two battalions, as part of the Enhanced Land Force plan. As part of this, a second mechanised infantry battalion was raised by de-linking 5/7 RAR to become the 5th Battalion and 7th Battalion. On 5 December 2006, the 5th/7th Battalion was formally de-linked, restoring the 7th Battalion to the order of battle. The battalion was raised in January 2007 with the nucleus of a battalion headquarters and with B Company from the split.

The battalion contributed a mechanised platoon to two rotations of the ANZAC Battle Group deployment to Timor in 2007 and 2008 as part of Operation Astute. In 2008–09, elements of the battalion deployed to Afghanistan as part of Operation Slipper, forming the basis for the 1st Mentoring and Reconstruction Task Force (MRTF-1). One member of the battalion was killed in action during an engagement near Kakarak on 16 March 2009.

At the same time, in Australia, the battalion began receiving new intakes of soldiers and undertook an intensive training program which saw the battalion certified as "operationally deployable" in January 2009, well before the planned date of 2010. 7 RAR subsequently relocated to Horseshoe Lines at RAAF Base Edinburgh near Adelaide in South Australia in 2010–11.

=== Afghanistan ===
==== Reconstruction Task Force – 1 ====
In late 2006, the Darwin-based 5/7 RAR deployed to Afghanistan as part of Reconstruction Task Force 1, with the 1st Combat Engineer Regiment with protective elements from the 5th/7th Battalion, Royal Australian Regiment, 6th Battalion, Royal Australian Regiment and 2nd Cavalry Regiment. The addition this infantry based combat team provided by the newly re-raised 7 RAR allowed the influence of RTF 1 to expand into key areas significant distances away from Forward Operating Base (FOB) Davis.

With Bushmaster PMVs and Light Armoured Vehicles, 1 RTF was able to secure the job sites incorporated into its expanded role. The Reconstruction Task Force was tasked with reconstruction and the improvement of provincial infrastructure (schools, hospitals, bridges etc.) and community-based projects to assist the Afghan Government in securing a future for its people. The task force also provided trade training to the local population and military engineering training to the Afghan National Army.

==== Mentoring and Reconstruction Task Force – 1 ====
Prior to October 2008, the Australian Defence Force's commitment to Operation Slipper in Afghanistan was purely focused on the rebuilding efforts of the reconstruction force and the combat role of the Special Operations Task Group (SOTG). However, with the deployment of MRTF-1 in 2008–09 it saw a change in mission focus to the infantry's previous role during the RTF. MRTF-1 saw the role of the infantry in Afghanistan expand with the inclusion of a mentoring component provided by the first Operational and Mentor Liaison Team (OMLT).

The focus of the OMLT during 7 RAR's deployment for MRTF-1 was similar to that of the Australian Army Training Team (AATT-V) in Vietnam, with a focus on mentoring the ANA 2nd Kandak, and also enhancing the tactical employment of the battalion against the Taliban. The MRTF-1 battle group (BG) was composed of a variety of different elements, however the core of the BG and its hierarchy were members from 7 RAR. The 7 RAR BG consisted of Combat Team Tusk (B Company from 7 RAR), 1st Field Squadron and a Combat Service Support Team (CSST).

Combat Team Tusk consisted of 7 RAR infantrymen, Combat Engineers, ASLAVs, Mortars (5 RAR) and Snipers (1 RAR). During the course of its deployment to Afghanistan, members of 7 RAR received the following decorations: one Distinguished Service Cross, three Medals for Gallantry, four Distinguished Service Medals, one Conspicuous Service Medal, three Commendations for Gallantry, one Medal of the Order of Australia, two Commendations for Distinguished Service, and one United States Army Commendation Medal.

==== Advisor Task Force – 1 ====
The 7th Battalion, the Royal Australian Regiment Task Group (7 RAR Task Group) handed over the role of advising the Afghan National Army's (ANA) 4th Brigade to the 2nd Cavalry Regiment Task Group (2 CAV Task Group) on 15 June 2013. 7 RAR had been deployed from November 2012 to June 2013.

Through the Afghan winter and into the traditional summer fighting season, 7 RAR Task Group supported the 4th ANA Brigade in its conduct of more than 13 independent brigade-level operations, maintaining pressure on the insurgency. Throughout the deployment ATF 1 continued to provide force protection support to Australian and International Security Assistance Force elements in Uruzgan. ATF 1 also supported the transition of responsibility for security to Afghan forces in the province.

==== Advisor Task Force – 2 ====
A further 7 RAR contingent provided the infantry element to Advisor Task Group – 2. ATF-2 was commanded by Commanding Officer 2 CAV Task Group Lieutenant Colonel Michael Bye. Taking over in June 2013, ATF-2 continued to provide force protection support to Australian and International Security Assistance Force elements in Uruzgan and supported the process of security transition in the province, which saw governance and security transition to the Afghan people. 7 RAR personnel were primarily responsible for force protection, including quick reaction forces. ATF-2 shifted its mission focus, gradually reducing advisory support as the Afghan National Army transitioned to independence in their brigade headquarters, the Combat Service Support Kandak (Battalion) and the Garrison Support Unit. ATF-2 served with the last formed body of Australian Defence Force personnel to serve in Uruzgan province, returning to Australia in February 2014.

=== Transition to standard infantry battalion and current composition ===
The battalion was de-mechanised in 2013 to become a dismounted infantry battalion under Plan Beersheba. This involved the loss of all M113 AS4 APCs and the battalion became reliant on 1 Brigade assets for transport. The battalion's composition was referred to as the Standard Infantry Battalion (SIB) format and consisted of:

- Battalion headquarters.
- Three rifle companies (Alpha, Bravo, and Charlie).
- Support company.
- Administration company.

The battalion has since reverted to a mechanised infantry battalion. Under Land 400 phase 3, 7 RAR will become the sole Mechanised Infantry Battalion for the Australian Army equipped with AS IFV Redback. All other Mechanised Battalions are set to lose their M113A4s and revert to standard light infantry units.

=== Iraq ===
==== Task Group Taji – Rotation 3 ====
During May 2016, elements of 7 RAR deployed to Iraq as part of Task Group Taji – Rotation 3 (TGT-3), taking over from 8/9 RAR. TGT-3 was a combined Australian-New Zealand force located at the Taji Military Complex northwest of Baghdad. TG Taji supports an international effort to train and build the capacity of regular Iraqi Security Forces (ISF) to defeat Islamic State and secure Iraq. The Task Group consisted of around 300 ADF personnel, alongside around 110 New Zealand Defence Force personnel, comprising trainers, force protection, support and command elements. The bulk of Australian personnel were from 7 RAR.

TGT-3 delivered combat training, focusing on basic warfighting skills like training on US weapons and equipment, marksmanship, urban TTPs, explosive hazards awareness, care of the battle casualty and fire and movement. Specialist training included mortars, signals, snipers and reconnaissance. As of October 2016, TGT-3 had trained approximately 6,000 Iraqi Army soldiers, many of whom took part in the Battle of Mosul. During TGT-3's rotation, the Australian Government changed its policy regarding where and whom Australian forces are authorised to train in Iraq. Not only are Australian forces permitted to train Iraqi Army, but Iraqi Security Forces in general, including Federal Police at various sites including the Taji Military Complex and other secure Coalition bases in Iraq.

== Customs and traditions ==
7 RAR has developed many unique customs and traditions throughout its history. Some aspects of this identity are presented below.

=== The Pig ===
The 7 RAR mascot and nickname, "the Pigs", has a long and celebrated history within the battalion. According to Corporal Roy Savage:

The single men of 3 RAR were sent to Puckapunyal to form a new battalion, 7 RAR. I arrived there on 11th November 1965. At first there were only regular soldiers. We used to keep the boozer open all weekend having the cooks bring our meals there. Anyway, on my second week there the new CO (Colonel Eric Smith) decided to inspect his new battalion area on a Sunday. He immediately closed the boozer. The next day he called a muster parade of the whole battalion and commenced to tell us what he thought of us. Half way through his speech he said and I quote, 'You are nothing but a mob of pigs'. Then from the back rank someone called out 'oink oink'. From that time onwards we became the Pig Battalion.

=== Pipes and Drums ===
In 1969, following the formation of the Australian Army Band Corps, infantry units serving in Vietnam found themselves without stretcher bearers, who tended to come from unit bands. To solve this problem, the Army directed the regular battalions of the Royal Australian Regiment to form new bands; to avoid competing directly with the new band corps, it was decided that these new bands would be either pipes and drums, bugle and drums or fife and drums. The 7th Battalion decided to form a pipe band. This was then passed to the 5th/7th Battalion, Royal Australian Regiment on its formation in 1973. The marches of each sub-unit are as follows:

- Battalion quick march – "Australaise"
- Battalion slow march – "Cock o' The North"
- Battalion Headquarters – "Steamboat"
- A Company – "The Black Bear"
- B Company – "Nut Brown Maiden"
- C Company – "The Glendarvel Highlanders"
- Support Company – "Bonnie Dundee"
- Administration Company – "the Muckin O' Geordie's Brye"

=== The CO's Table ===
During Operation Santa Fe in October and November 1967, 7th Battalion conducted a search and destroy task in the north east of Phouc Tuy Province. During the reorganisation of one part of the battle, a VC bed was discovered by members of the battalion. Subsequently, the CO, Lieutenant Colonel Eric Smith, decided that the bed would be best put to use as a map table on which to plot his callsigns from his command post. The table currently resides on the ground floor of 7RAR battalion headquarters, in Adelaide.

=== Graham Cornes Football Match ===
Graham Cornes OAM (born 31 March 1948 in Melbourne, Victoria) is a former Australian rules footballer and coach, as well as a media personality. Graham Cornes is also a Vietnam veteran, having served in Vietnam as a soldier with 7 RAR in 1968. An annual football match is played between 7 RAR and 16th Air Land Regiment for the Graham Cornes trophy, in recognition of his service to the battalion, AFL, and the nation.

== Battle honours ==
7 RAR currently holds the following battle honours:

- Bien-Hoa, Vietnam (1967–68) and Vietnam (1970–71).

== Alliances ==
- United Kingdom – The Highlanders.

== Commanding officers ==
The following officers commanded 7 RAR:

- Lieutenant Colonel E.H. Smith, DSO (1 September 1965 – 24 November 1968)
- Lieutenant Colonel R.A. Grey, DSO (25 November 1968 – 14 May 1971)
- Major J.J. Farry (15 May 1971 – 18 July 1971)
- Lieutenant Colonel I.B. Mackay (19 July 1971 – 18 March 1973)
- Lieutenant Colonel P.N. Greenhalgh, AM (19 March 1973 – 2 December 1973)
- Lieutenant Colonel S. Gabriel, DSC (3 December 2006 – December 2009)
- Lieutenant Colonel M. Garraway, AM (December 2009 – December 2012)
- Lieutenant Colonel M. Wells, DSC (December 2012 – 8 December 2014)
- Lieutenant Colonel D. McCammon, DSM (8 December 2014 – January 2017)
- Lieutenant Colonel P.W. Graham, DSM (January 2017 – December 2018)
- Lieutenant Colonel A.W. Gower (December 2018 – December 2020)
- Lieutenant Colonel R.L. Spackman (December 2020 – December 2022)
- Lieutenant Colonel L.J. Lambert (January 2023–present)

== Regimental Sergeants Major ==
The following soldiers served as RSM of 7 RAR:

- Warrant Officer Class One H.B. Clively (10 September 1965 – 21 August 1966)
- Warrant Officer Class One A.P. Thompson, MBE (1966–1968)
- Warrant Officer Class One R.A. Bandy, MBE (1968–1970)
- Warrant Officer Class One D. Muir (1970–1973)
- Warrant Officer Class Two B.H. Cox (22 September 1973 – 2 December 1973)
- Warrant Officer Class One D.J. Allen (2007–2009)
- Warrant Officer Class One R. Verrall, OAM (2010–2013)
- Warrant Officer Class One M. Landy, OAM (2013–2015)
- Warrant Officer Class One M. Bold (January 2016– January 2018)
- Warrant Officer Class One B.F. Fawcett (January 2018 – January 2020)
- Warrant Officer Class One P. A. Dehnert, CSC (January – December 2020)
- Warrant Officer Class One J. Craig (January 2021 – 2022)
- Warrant Officer Class One A. Ashman (January 2023–present)

== Notes ==
Footnotes

Citations

https://www.contactairlandandsea.com/2022/10/28/9th-becomes-armys-newest-combat-brigade/
