= First and second battles of Kakarak =

First and Second Battles of Kakarak
- Part of the War in Afghanistan (2001–present)
Date	16 March – 12 April 2009
Location	Kakarak, Orūzgān Province, Afghanistan
Result	Coalition victory

Belligerents
Australia; (Afghanistan) Afghan National Army; United States; Netherlands	(Afghanistan) Taliban insurgents

Commanders and leaders
(Australia) Shane Gabriel; (Australia) Jacob Kleinman; (Australia) Ashley Judd	(Afghanistan) Various

Strength
~40–50 men	~100 men

Casualties and losses
1 killed	20 killed

The First and Second Battles of Kakarak (16 March – 12 April 2009) were fought near the village of Kakarak in the West Dorafshan district of Orūzgān Province, in southern Afghanistan. The fighting took place between Australian forces from the 1st Mentoring and Reconstruction Task Force (MRTF-1) and Taliban fighters, with the area considered to be one of the last Taliban outposts in the area. During the first action on the morning of 16 March a six-man Australian Operational Mentoring and Liaison Team (OMLT) operating with Afghan National Army (ANA) troops was contacted by a numerically superior Taliban force near the village. In the ensuing battle one Australian was killed before close air support from Dutch AH-64D Apache helicopter gunships and US aircraft allowed them to withdraw after inflicting heavy casualties on the Taliban insurgents.

A month later, on 12 April, an Australian platoon was attacked by a large Taliban force near Kakarak during a combined Australian and Afghan offensive known as Operation Shak Hawel. Outnumbered, the Australians were initially forced to withdraw into a nearby compound, returning fire with small-arms and grenade launchers, before cavalry in an overwatch position decisively engaged the Taliban force, allowing the Australians to regain the initiative. Australian Special Forces moved to establish a blocking position and engaged the Taliban from the rear, while close air support was called in, inflicting heavy casualties on the insurgents and forcing them to withdraw following two hours of fighting. That evening further airstrikes destroyed a compound being used by the insurgents. Although the battle witnessed some of the heaviest and most sustained fighting experienced by conventional Australian forces since the Vietnam War, they suffered no casualties. The operation significantly disrupted insurgent activities in the area.

== Background ==
By early 2009 the Kakarak region, located in the West Dorafshan district of Orūzgān Province approximately 12 kilometres (7.5 mi) north of Tarin Kowt, was one of the last Taliban outposts in the area. The Australian 1st Mentoring and Reconstruction Task Force (MRTF-1)—a combined arms battle group based on the 7th Battalion, Royal Australian Regiment under the command Lieutenant Colonel Shane Gabriel—was part of the Dutch-led Task Force Uruzgan and was responsible for mentoring Afghan National Army (ANA) troops from the 4th Brigade, 205th Corps that were based in the area. Operating from Patrol Base Buman in the Chora Valley, 3.5 kilometres (2.2 mi) east of Kakarak overlooking the Dorashan River, Combat Team Tusk from MRTF-1 was the main Australian force in the area, working with ANA troops from the 2nd Kandak, 4th Brigade. The area had previously been witnessed fighting between an Australian-mentored ANA patrol and Taliban insurgents on 4 January 2009; however, in the months that followed the town became the scene of two more significant engagements. (Note: For his actions during this contact, one of the Australians with the patrol, Sergeant John Lines, was later awarded the Medal of Gallantry. See Hetherington, Andrew (21 July 2011). "'We were very lucky'". Army News. Canberra: Australian Department of Defence. pp. 18–19.)

== Battle ==
=== 16 March 2009 ===
On 16 March 2009 a six-man Australian patrol from an Operational Mentoring and Liaison Team (OMLT), working together with the ANA, was engaged at 09:30 by 20 Taliban fighters near the village of Kakarak. Under the command of Lieutenant Jacob Kleinman the outnumbered Australian patrol fought back, but not before one of the section commanders was seriously wounded in the head by small-arms fire. The Australians subsequently secured a compound and suppressed the Taliban forces that were attempting to outflank them, while the patrol's medic moved across 50 metres (55 yd) of open ground under heavy fire to render first aid to the injured soldier and evacuate him to area of relative safety. At 10:20 two Dutch AH-64D Apache helicopter gunships arrived on station to provide aerial fire support, allowing the Australians and Afghans to break contact, while the casualty evacuation was effected under fire by a US UH-60 Blackhawk helicopter as they withdrew. Despite receiving further emergency treatment, the injured Australian soldier subsequently died of his wounds.

Meanwhile, another Australian patrol from MRTF-1 was nearby providing security for the OMLT, and they were also engaged with small-arms and rocket-propelled grenades (RPGs) by another Taliban force of up to 40 fighters. Dutch helicopters and US aircraft continued to provide close air support to the Australians, and following heavy fighting the Taliban were forced to withdraw after suffering heavy casualties. After marrying-up the two Australian force elements returned to their Patrol Base Buman, which was completed by 12:01. However Australian Special Forces from the Special Operations Task Group (SOTG)—then based on 2 Squadron, Special Air Service Regiment—subsequently established blocking positions to prevent the Taliban withdrawal, and they later contacted a group of ten insurgents, killing a number of them in the ensuing fighting. For his leadership Kleinman was later awarded the Distinguished Service Medal, while Lance Corporal Giancarlos Taraborrelli and Private David Cox were both awarded the Medal for Gallantry.

=== 12 April 2009 ===
Following the earlier Australian operations in the area, key Taliban leaders and a number of fighters were believed to have moved south along the banks of the Dorafshan River and Gabriel subsequently tasked Combat Team Tusk with clearing the East Dorafshan in preparation for further operations west of the river. Australian Special Forces from SOTG were also operating in the area, conducting disruption operations in the West Dorasfshan area. Between 3–15 April the Australians conducted Operation Shak Hawel (or Mysterious Area) in the fertile green-zone around Patrol Base Buman, in order to target the Taliban stronghold. More than 200 Australians were involved—nearly half the battle group—including a combined arms force element with infantry, cavalry and engineers, and an ANA battalion from the 2nd Kandak, 4th ANA Brigade. Throughout the offensive, Australian and Afghan troops were engaged in numerous fire-fights as they conducted intensive patrolling and cordon and search operations to restrict insurgent freedom of movement throughout the area of operations. However, during the biggest battle, dozens of Taliban fighters were killed as they attempted to ambush an Australian force operating in the fertile green belt.

On the morning of 12 April, while operating in support of an Australian OMLT mentoring ANA forces, a 40-man platoon from Combat Team Tusk—2 Platoon under the command of Lieutenant Ashley Judd—was engaged by a large Taliban force after successfully surprising and engaging an Improvised Explosive Device (IED) emplacement team in a nearby compound around 06:20. Forced to withdraw into the compound after being fired on by small-arms and RPGs, the outnumbered Australians then responded aggressively, with the infantry returning fire with small-arms and 40 mm grenade launchers, while ASLAV gun cars from cavalry in an overwatch position decisively engaged the insurgents across the river with their 25 mm chain guns. Meanwhile, Australian Special Forces to the west also provided an effective blocking force, engaging the Taliban force from the rear.

Having regained the initiative, 1 Platoon was subsequently pushed to the north in an attempt to the cut-off insurgent reinforcements. As the fighting subsided, 2 Platoon continued to be harassed with RPGs by insurgents occupying the dead ground. The Australians responded with air burst fire from their 84 mm Carl Gustav rocket launchers, yet this proved only partially effective. Dutch AH-64D Apaches and US aircraft were then called in to suppress the insurgents in the dead ground, as the Australians forced the Taliban to withdraw with heavy casualties after two hours of intense fighting. However, as the insurgents were believed to be preparing to mortar the compound, the Australians then withdrew back to the overwatch position, before calling in an airstrike onto another compound being used by the insurgents. The Australian Special Forces then moved back into the engagement area to conduct battlefield clearance, and under the cover of the ASLAVs, they neutralised the remaining insurgents before securing the compound that had been previously hit. A large cache of 107 mm rockets and small arms was subsequently uncovered, along with a tunnel system. A second airstrike at 23:00 completed the destruction of the compound.

The following day the local civilians were observed collecting the dead insurgents in order to bury them in accordance with Islamic custom. Four insurgents were confirmed killed, while total Taliban losses during the fighting were believed to have numbered at least 20 killed and 20 wounded, including a number of key commanders. There were no Australian casualties, and despite the intensity of the fighting no civilians were believed to have been injured. The battle witnessed some of the heaviest and most sustained fighting experienced by conventional Australian forces since the Vietnam War, with as many as 60–100 insurgents thought to have been involved. (Note: For his leadership during earlier fighting in the Chora Valley on 29 December 2008 Judd was later awarded a Commendation for Distinguished Service. See "Queen's Birthday Honours". Australian Infantry Magazine. Singleton: School of Infantry: 38–39. October 2010. ISSN 1447-5545.)

== Aftermath ==
The operation ended in a decisive victory for the Australians, significantly disrupting insurgent activities in the area with the subsequent clearance of the West Dorafshan three weeks later being largely uneventful as a result, while rocket attacks against Forward Operating Base Ripley in Tarin Kowt also ceased for the next eight months. Later, the construction of a patrol base nearby further extended ANA influence over the area. Meanwhile, a senior insurgent commander, Mullah Noorullah, who was believed to have been involved in the fighting on 12 April, was killed in early May by Australian Special Forces in a joint operation after he and another insurgent were tracked moving into a tunnel system.

== Notes ==
Footnotes

Citations
