= Regimental Square =

War memorial in Sydney

Royal Australian Regiment Memorial
- Australia
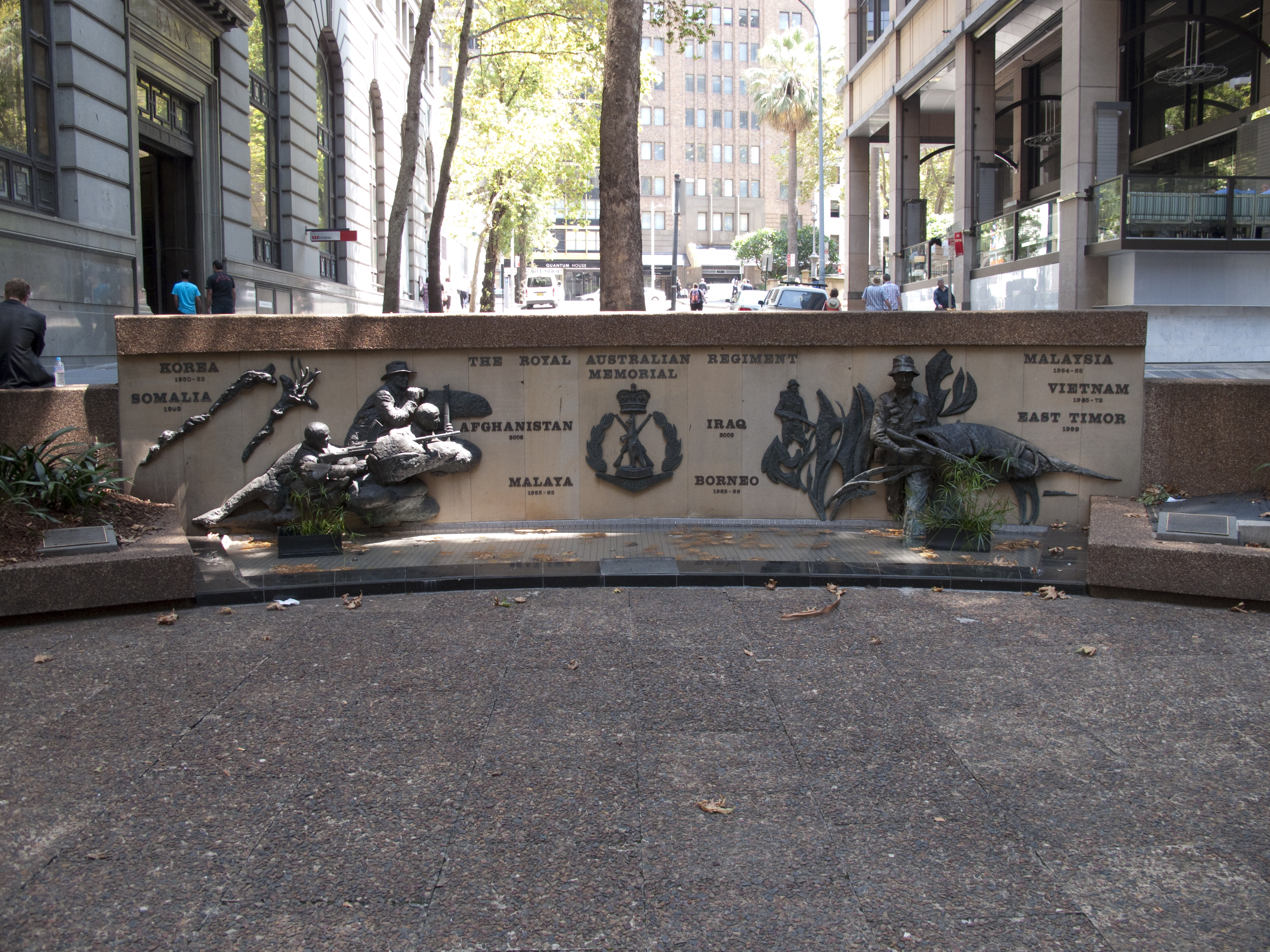
- Royal Australian Regiment Memorial, Regimental Square, Sydney
- For the campaigns of the Royal Australian Regiment in Korea, Malaya and Vietnam
- Unveiled: 8 December 1976
- Location: 33°52′1.43″S 151°12′24.81″E near Sydney, Australia
- Designed by: Dennis Adams OAM

Regimental Square is a war memorial in the Wynyard area in the city centre of Sydney, Australia. An upgrade of the area was expected to be completed by mid-2016.

== Description ==
The memorial is in the form of a small, pedestrianised square, occupying the whole width of a section of Wynyard Street that adjoins George Street, a major thoroughfare. The memorial was erected to commemorate the campaigns of the Royal Australian Regiment in Korea, Malaya and Vietnam. A series of bronze sculptures of soldiers in action, are attached to a wall of Sydney sandstone, 8 metres long x 1.5 metres high. Dennis Adams OAM was commissioned, to create the memorial, by the Royal Australian Regiment Association, the funds acquired through subscriptions from members and friends, supplemented by a gift of $3,000 from the Government of South Korea. On 8 December 1976 the memorial was unveiled by the then Governor of New South Wales, Sir Roden Cutler.

== Gallery ==
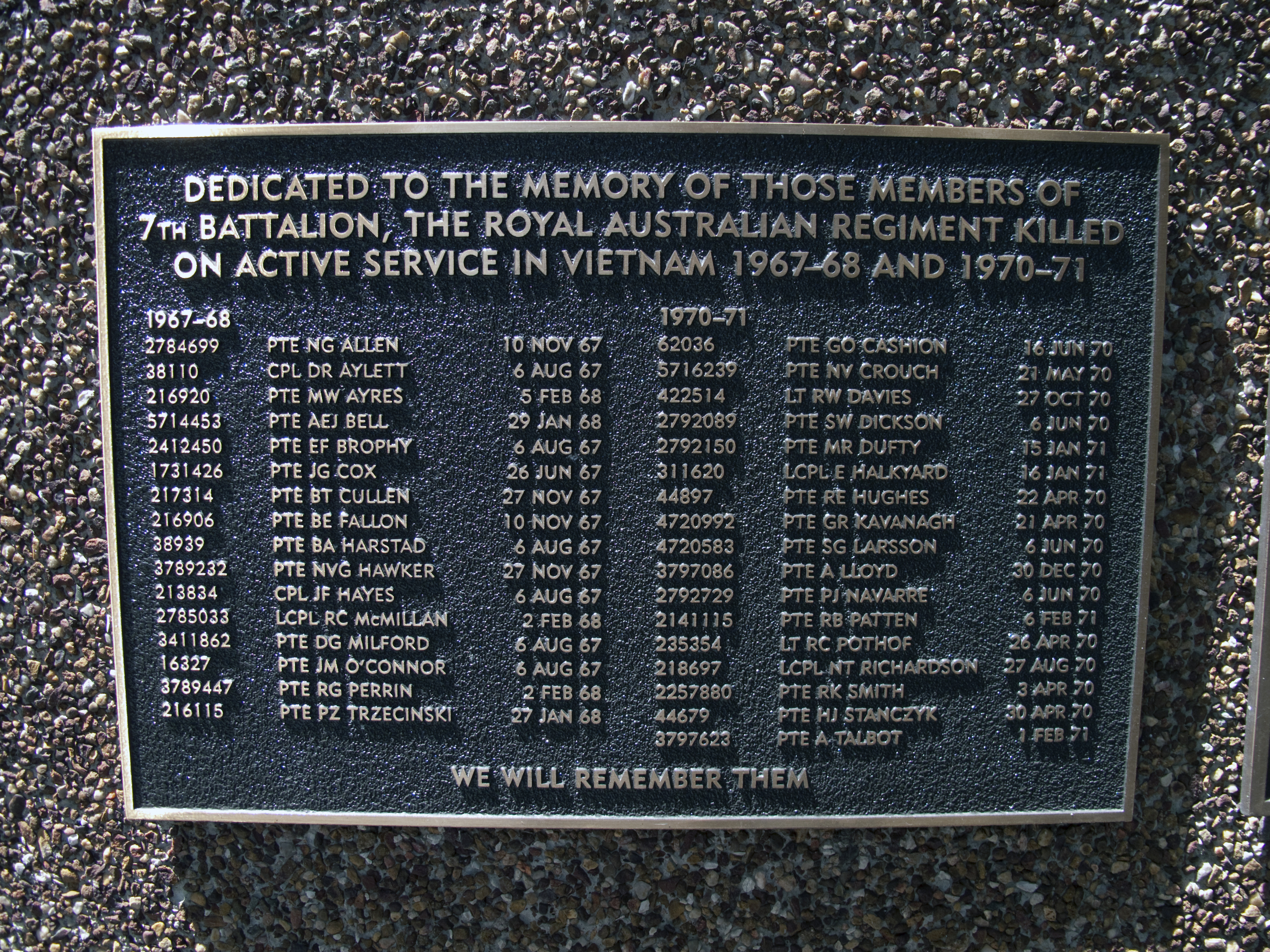
List of the members of the RAR 7th battalion killed in Vietnam 1967–68 and 1970–71.

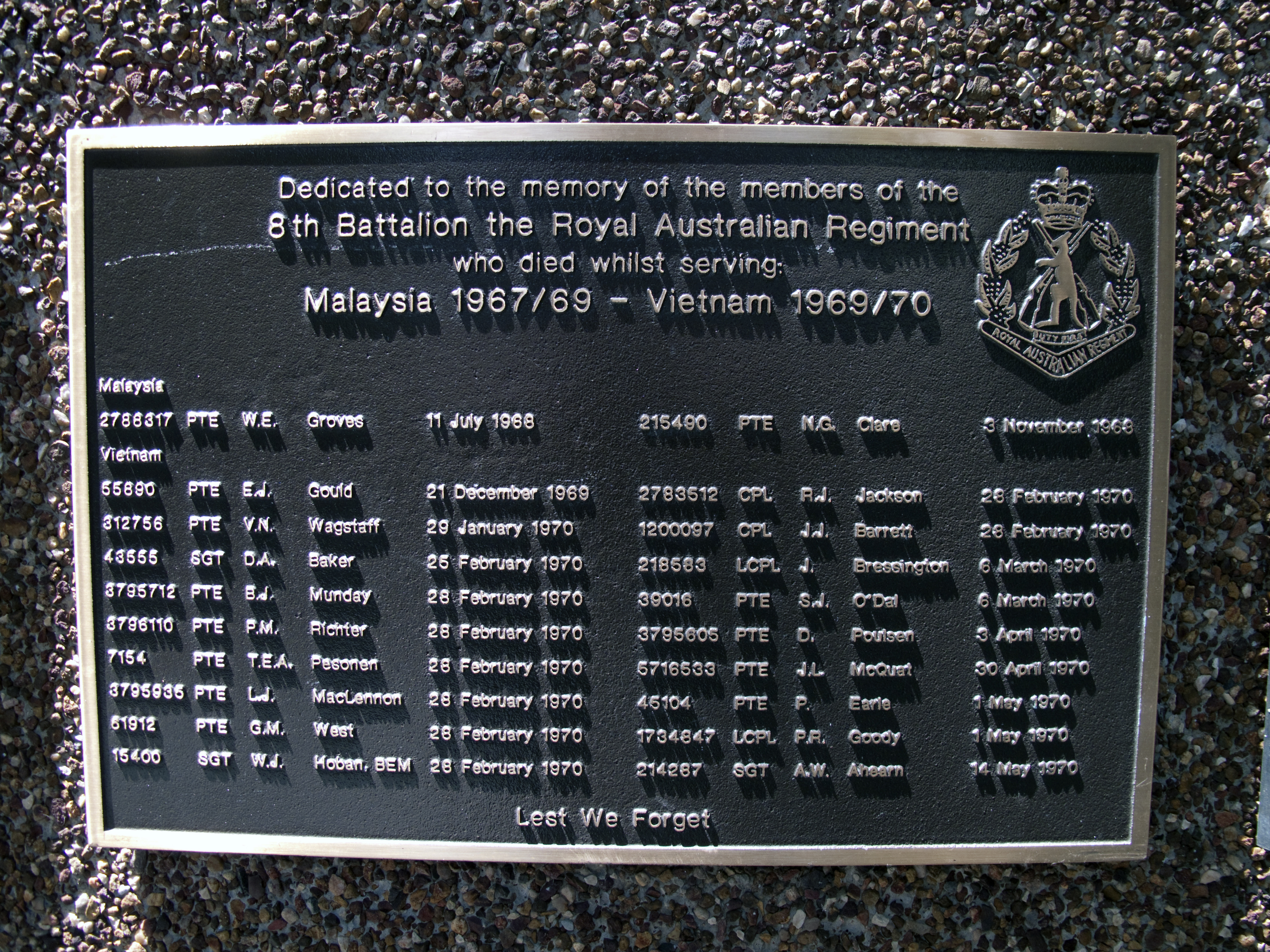
List of the members of the RAR 8th battalion killed in Malaysia 1967–69 and Vietnam 1969–70.

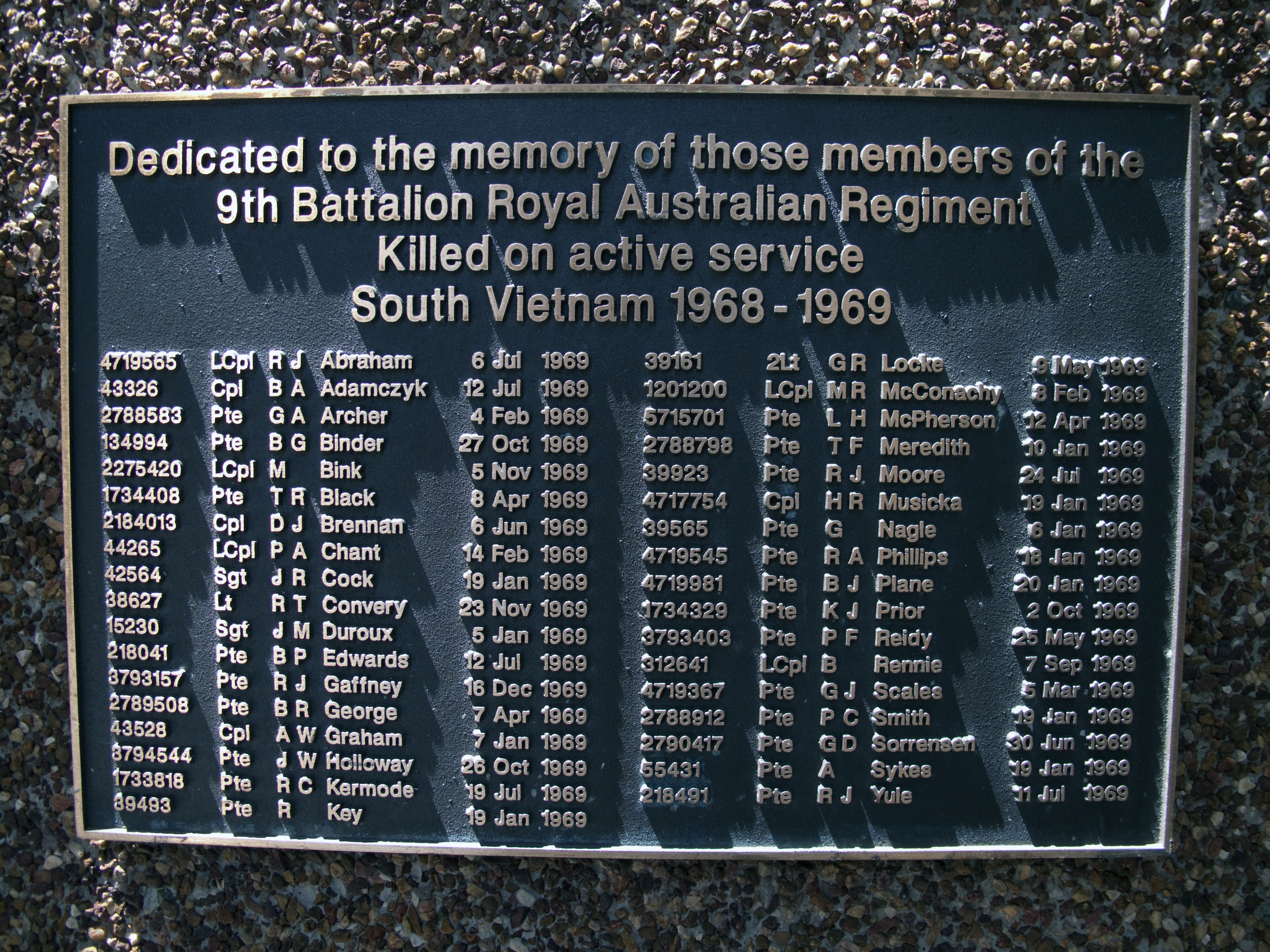
List of the members of the RAR 9th battalion killed in South Vietnam 1968–69.

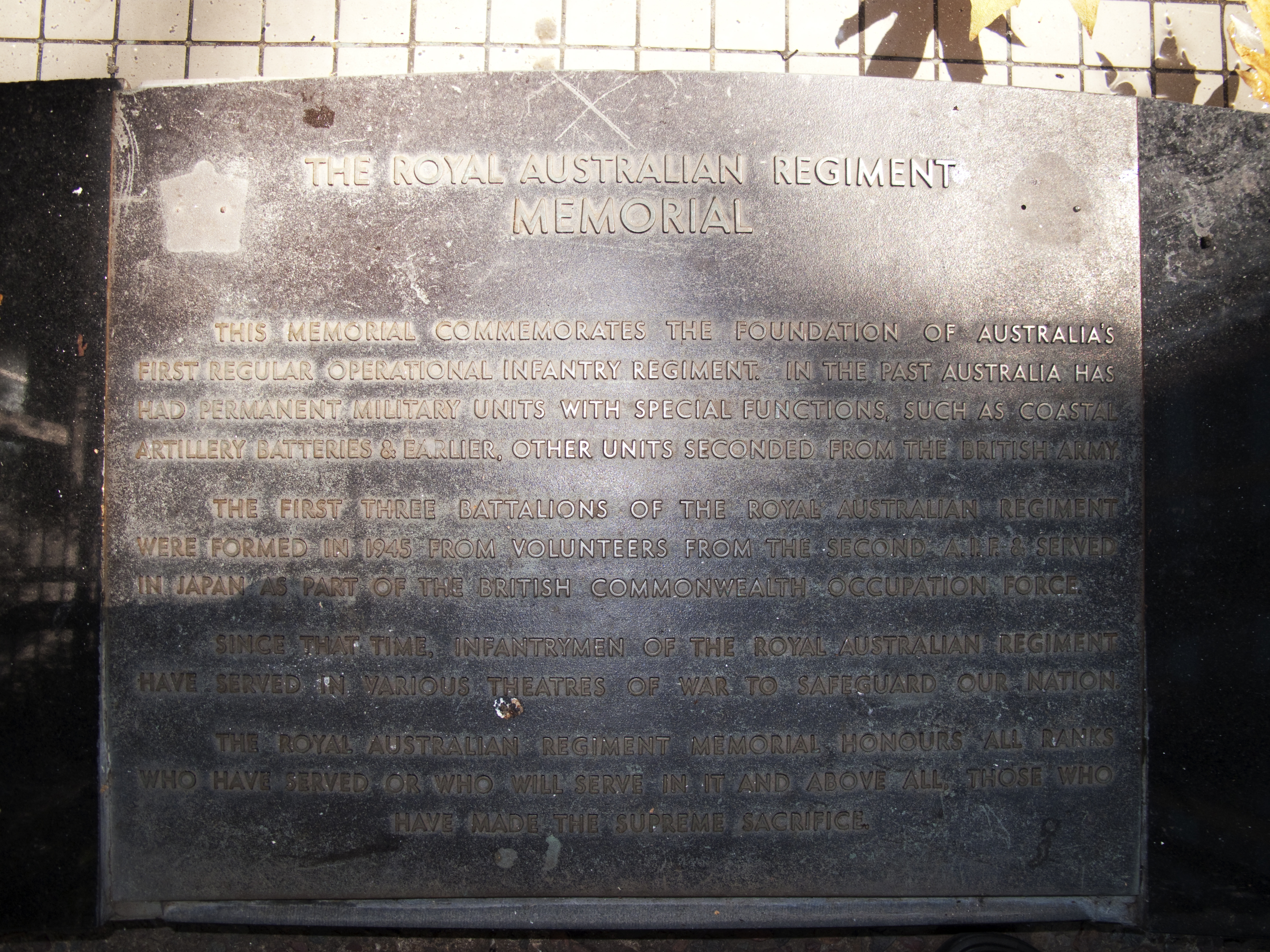
Explanation of the memorial.

== See also ==
- Royal Australian Regiment
