= Royal Australian Regiment =

Administrative regiment for regular infantry battalions of the Australian Army

The Royal Australian Regiment
- Cap badge of the Royal Australian Regiment
- Active: 23 November 1948 – present
- Country: Australia
- Branch: Army
- Type: Line infantry
- Role: Mechanised infantry (2 battalions); Motorised infantry (2 battalions); Amphibious infantry (1 battalion); Airmobile infantry (1 battalion)
- Size: Six battalions
- Part of: Royal Australian Infantry Corps
- Garrison/HQ: 1st Battalion – Townsville; 2nd Battalion – Townsville; 3rd Battalion – Townsville; 5th/7th Battalion – Darwin; 6th Battalion – Enoggera; 8th/9th Battalion – Enoggera
- Nicknames: 1st Battalion – The Pony Soldiers or The Big Blue One; 2nd Battalion – Second to None; 3rd Battalion – Old Faithful; 4th Battalion – The Fighting Fourth; 5th Battalion – The Tiger Battalion; 6th Battalion – Bluedog; 7th Battalion – The Pigs; 8th Battalion – The Grey Eight; 8th/9th Battalion – Old Dependable Brisbane's Own
- Motto: Duty First
- Colours: 3rd Battalion and 6th Battalion entitled to wear the Unit Citation for Gallantry and the US PUC streamers on the Regimental Colour; whilst the 1st Battalion has been awarded the Unit Citation for Gallantry, the US MUC and Gallantry Cross (South Vietnam) streamers on the Regimental Colour
- March: Quick – El Alamein (Band); Black Bear (Pipes and Drums); Slow – Infantry Song
- Mascots: 1st Battalion – Shetland pony "Septimus"; 3rd Battalion – None; 4th Battalion – None; 5th/7th Battalion – Sumatran tiger "Quintus Rama"; 6th Battalion – Blue Heeler Corporal "Ridgeliegh Blue"; 8th/9th Battalion – Merino ram John "Stan the Ram" Macarthur

Commanders
- Current commander: Major General Shane Caughey (Colonel commandant)
- Colonel of the Regiment: Sam Mostyn (Governor-General of Australia)

Insignia
- Tartan: The Australian (2 and 7 RAR piper's kilts and plaids); Royal Stewart (3 RAR piper's kilts and plaids)
- Abbreviation: RAR

The Royal Australian Regiment (RAR) is the parent administrative regiment for regular infantry battalions of the Australian Army and is the senior infantry regiment of the Royal Australian Infantry Corps. It was originally formed in 1945 as a three battalion regiment made up of the 65th, 66th and 67th infantry battalions; however, since then its size has fluctuated as battalions have been raised, amalgamated or disbanded in accordance with the Australian government's strategic requirements. Currently, the regiment consists of six battalions and has fulfilled various roles including those of light, parachute, motorised, mechanised and armored infantry. Throughout its existence, units of the Royal Australian Regiment have deployed on operations in Japan, Korea, Malaya, Borneo, Vietnam, Somalia, Rwanda, Cambodia, East Timor, the Solomon Islands, Iraq and Afghanistan.

== Organisation ==
The Royal Australian Regiment (RAR) is part of the Royal Australian Infantry Corps, along with the six state-based infantry regiments of the Australian Army Reserve. It is the most senior of the corps' regiments in the order of precedence, and currently consists of seven Regular Army infantry battalions:

- 1st Battalion (1 RAR) – Airmobile infantry
- 2nd Battalion (2 RAR) – Amphibious/light infantry
- 3rd Battalion (3 RAR) – Armored/Mechanised infantry
- 5th/7th Battalion (5/7 RAR) – Littoral infantry
- 6th Battalion (6 RAR) – Motorised infantry
- 8th/9th Battalion (8/9 RAR) – Motorised infantry.

The battalions of the regiment are capable of providing seven of the ten regular battlegroups that the Australian Army has available for deployment. The current order of battle sees 5/7 RAR as part of the 1st Brigade based in Darwin; 1 and 3 RAR as part of the 3rd Brigade in Townsville, and 6 and 8/9 RAR as part of the 7th Brigade in Brisbane. 2 RAR in Townsville reports directly to 1st Division Headquarters.

=== Former battalions ===
- 2nd/4th Battalion (1973–95), delinked to 2 RAR and 4 RAR
- 4th Battalion (1964–73 and 1995–2009), renamed as 2nd Commando Regiment
- 5th Battalion (1965–73 and 2006–2024), linked to 7 RAR
- 7th Battalion (1965–73 and 2007–2024), linked to 5 RAR
- 8th Battalion (1966–73), amalgamated to 8/9 RAR
- 9th Battalion (1967–73), amalgamated to 8/9 RAR
- 10th Independent Rifle Company (1974 – late 1990s), disbanded.

== History ==
=== Formation, 1948 ===
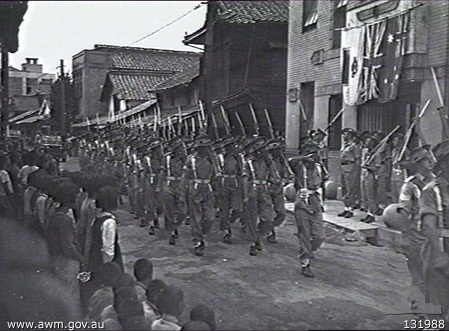
Troops from the 66th Battalion march through Saijo, Japan in 1946

The origins of the Royal Australian Regiment lie in the decision made by the Australian government to raise a force for occupation duties in Japan at the end of the Second World War. The 34th Australian Infantry Brigade was raised in October 1945 from Second Australian Imperial Force (2nd AIF) personnel then serving in the South West Pacific Area, with the three battalions of the brigade designated as the 65th, 66th and 67th Australian Infantry Battalions of the AIF. The 65th Battalion was formed from volunteers from the 7th Division and the 2/40th Battalion. The 66th Battalion received volunteers from the 9th Division and 1st Australian Corps troops. The 67th Battalion was formed from the 3rd, 6th, and 11th Divisions. After concentrating on the island of Morotai, the 34th Brigade moved to Japan and joined the British Commonwealth Occupation Force (BCOF) in February 1946.

The 34th Brigade became the basis of the post-war Regular Army in 1947, and when the decision was taken in 1948 to withdraw two of the battalions to Australia, attention turned to the status and designation of these units. Brigadier Ronald Hopkins, commander of the brigade, was concerned that despite the unit prestige and regimental spirit developed since October 1945, it would be undesirable to have the regular units the highest numbered, without battle honours or colours, and with precedence after Militia units. Consideration was given to whether the battalions might be designated as separate regiments. For example, the 65th Battalion might have become the 1st Infantry Battalion, City of Sydney's Own Regiment under one proposal or the 1st Battalion, King George VI's Australian Rifle Regiment under another. (Note: Hopkins advocated the adoption of the designations of a number of Citizen Military Forces (CMF) units that had not been re-raised when the CMF had been reformed in 1948, with the 65th Battalion to be designated the 1st Infantry Battalion, City of Sydney's Own Regiment, the 66th Battalion as the 1st Infantry Battalion, Royal Melbourne Regiment and the 67th the 1st Infantry Battalion, the Oxley Regiment. Meanwhile, a counter-proposal from the infantry cell in the Directorate of Staff Duties recommended the 65th Battalion be redesignated the 1st Battalion, King George VI's Australian Rifle Regiment, the 66th Battalion as the 1st Battalion, Queen Elizabeth's Australian Footguards, and the 67th Battalion the 1st Battalion, Princess Margaret's Australian Infantry Regiment.) Instead, the decision was taken to number the units sequentially as part of one large regiment and so on 23 November 1948 the 65th, 66th and 67th Battalions became the 1st, 2nd and 3rd Battalions of the Australian Regiment. An application was made for a royal title, which was granted on 10 March 1949. The Royal Australian Regiment thus came into being as Australia's first regiment of regular infantry. Since formation the battalions of the regiment have competed against each other in an annual military skills competition known as the Gloucester Cup.

=== Early years: Japan and Australia, 1948–1950 ===
The formation of the regiment following the end of the Second World War was fundamentally important to the post-war Australian Army, forming a key component of the first "permanent, professional army, available in peace and war for any task the government might direct". Prior to this time the Australian Army had been substantially a part-time militia with a permanent cadre. A major influence in the raising of the regiment was Australia's desire to secure a prominent role in the occupation of Japan and the eventual peace settlement. After some delays the 65th, 66th and 67th Battalions arrived in Japan's Hiroshima Prefecture in February 1946. Subsequent employment "involved activities designed to reinforce upon the Japanese the lesson of their defeat", in addition to guard duty, patrolling and training. In December 1948 the Australian component of the BCOF was reduced from a brigade to one understrength battalion, with the 1st and 2nd Battalions returning to Australia, while the 3rd Battalion remained in Japan.

On return to Australia the 34th Brigade became the 1st Brigade. The 1st Battalion was subsequently based in Ingleburn, New South Wales, and the 2nd Battalion at Puckapunyal, Victoria. Both units were significantly understrength as many men discharged on returning to Australia, while others elected to remain in Japan with the 3rd Battalion. Alan Morrison, a former member of the regiment, later recalled that for the two battalions that returned to Australia "...the first eighteen months of the regiment's existence were harrowing times". Many men discharged due to frustration and discontent, while the battalions were not strong enough to undertake meaningful training activities and their barracks were in a state of disrepair. Yet from this experience came the core "...of dedicated soldiers destined to be the non-commissioned officers of the regiment in the Korean War and the outstanding warrant officers and sergeants of the battalions that served in Malaya and in the early part of the Vietnam campaign".

The regiment has provided units and individuals for virtually all Australian Army deployments and operations since its formation. The first period of sustained operational service began with the regiment's first deployment in Korea in 1950 and continued until the withdrawal of combat units from Vietnam in 1972. These 22 years were arguably the most significant for the regiment with between one and three battalions involved in combat operations in South-East Asia at any one time. A second lengthy period of operational service commenced with the intervention in East Timor in 1999, which became the first of many commitments for the regiment that have continued to the present day. Approximately 85,000 personnel have served in the RAR during this time, with casualties sustained by the regiment on operations including 693 killed and over 3,000 wounded.

=== Korean War, 1950–1953 ===
Australian Infantry Battalions in Korea, 1950–1956
3 RAR	September 1950 – September 1954
1 RAR	April 1952 – March 1953; April 1954 – March 1956
2 RAR	March 1953 – April 1954
Source: Kuring 2004, p. 248

The Korean War was the first major test of the regiment. Following preparations in Japan, 3 RAR arrived in Pusan on 28 September 1950 and was attached to the 27th British Commonwealth Brigade. The initial invasion of South Korea by the North Korean People's Army (NKPA) had been broken by General Douglas MacArthur's amphibious landing at Inchon, and so, in what was a complicated war of manoeuvre, 3 RAR was involved in the pursuit of the NKPA back across the 38th parallel. On 21 October 1950, 3 RAR took part in the Battle of Yongyu in an apple orchard north of Pyongyang, the first large-scale engagement fought by a battalion of the regiment. The farthest north 3 RAR would advance into North Korea was the Pakchon–Chongju area following the Battle of Chongju, and it was near here that Lieutenant Colonel Charlie Green, the battalion's commanding officer, was mortally wounded on 30 October 1950. By November 1950, following the Chinese intervention, 3 RAR was withdrawing south along with the rest of the allied Eighth Army, fighting the Battle of Pakchon. However, following a UN counteroffensive a defensive line was established about 45 kilometres (28 mi) north of Seoul and it was here in April 1951 that 3 RAR, along with the 2nd Battalion, Princess Patricia's Canadian Light Infantry and supporting UN forces, fought a successful defensive action at the Battle of Kapyong. This battle proved to be the climactic point of the regiment's first year in Korea.

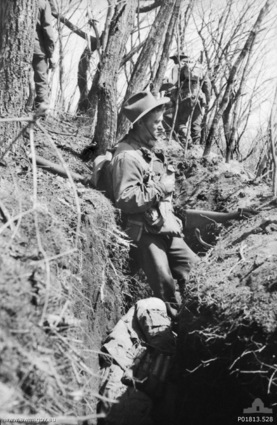
Soldiers from 3 RAR occupying Chinese trenches on 'Salmon', 16 April 1951.

By June 1951, 3 RAR moved to a position on the Imjin River under the command of the US I Corps and it was here that the battalion would spend the next two years of the war. The major action fought by the regiment in the second half of 1951 was the Battle of Maryang San, where 3 RAR, under the command of Lieutenant Colonel Frank Hassett, assaulted Hill 317 on 5 October 1951. Known as Operation Commando, Hill 317 was captured after five days of hard fighting. Following this action the war was defined by fixed defences of trenches, bunkers and wire, constant patrolling, and numerous clashes. In April 1952, 3 RAR was joined by 1 RAR and command of the 28th British Commonwealth Brigade, of which they were now a part, passed to an Australian officer as a result. Meanwhile, the expansion of the commitment in Korea to two battalions resulted in the establishment of a regimental depot at Ingleburn in 1952 to train and hold infantrymen for service in Korea. In April 1953, 1 RAR was replaced by 2 RAR on a system of unit rotation. During this changeover a parade was held to mark the first occasion that all battalions of the regiment had been on parade together. 1 RAR served a year in Korea, 2 RAR for four months before the armistice, while 3 RAR served throughout the war, earning itself the nickname of "Old Faithful". The last major action of the war for the regiment was the Battle of the Samichon River fought by 2 RAR over 24–26 July 1953, repulsing a number of major Chinese assaults just hours before the Armistice Agreement was signed.

Following the armistice both sides withdrew and a demilitarised zone was created. The period that followed proved uneventful, yet the UN forces were required to maintain combat readiness and the ability to react quickly in case the North Koreans violated the ceasefire. In April 1954, 2 RAR returned to Australia and was replaced by 1 RAR which remained in South Korea until March 1956. 3 RAR finally returned to Australia in September 1954 after four years of continuous service in Korea and five years before that in Japan. Total Army casualties in Korea included 293 killed, 1,210 wounded and 23 captured, the majority being infantrymen of the Royal Australian Regiment. The fighting in Korea provided the regiment with valuable combat experience, establishing a foundation for its further development and marking the emergence of the Australian Regular Army. The Korean War remains the only large-scale, conventional war that the regiment has fought. During this time the Army developed the capability to maintain two battalions on major operations at the same time.

=== Malaya and Borneo, 1955–1966 ===
Australian Infantry Battalions in Malaya and Borneo, 1955–66
Malaya, 1955–61
2 RAR	October 1955 – October 1957
3 RAR	September 1957 – October 1959
1 RAR	October 1959 – October 1961
Malaysia and Borneo during Confrontation, 1963–66
3 RAR	Mainland Malaysia, August 1963 – March 1965; Borneo, March – July 1965; Mainland Malaysia, July – September 1965
4 RAR	Mainland Malaysia, October 1965 – April 1966; Borneo, April – August 1966
Source: Kuring 2004, pp. 258 and 310

In April 1955 the Australian government had committed army, navy and air force elements to the Far East Strategic Reserve to assist in the defence of Malaya from internal and external security threats. While British Commonwealth forces had been operating against the communist terrorists since 1948, the battalions of the regiment came relatively late to the Malayan Emergency, and when 2 RAR arrived in theatre in October 1955 to join the 28th British Commonwealth Brigade, the war had been running for over seven years. 2 RAR was replaced by 3 RAR in 1957, which was in turn replaced by 1 RAR in 1959. During the Emergency the three battalions were involved in 45 contacts, killing 17 guerrillas for the loss of seven men killed in action. According to Jim Molan the attention to detail required of five years of infantry soldiering in Malaya exposed the regiment to jungle warfare skills developed by the British Army during its most successful counterinsurgency war. This experience later informed the development of its own doctrine, with the Malayan Emergency making a significant contribution to the professionalism of the regiment. Meanwhile, the regimental depot—which had been renamed 4 RAR soon after formation—was subsequently incorporated into the School of Infantry and renamed Depot Company, Royal Australian Regiment in 1960. Despite the end of the State of Emergency in Malaya, 1 RAR was employed on anti-terrorist operations along the Thai border in late 1960. 1 RAR was replaced in Malaya by 2 RAR in 1961, with the battalion involved in training and counter-terrorist operations. It was subsequently employed on operations along the Thai border for three months in mid-1962, and again in May and June 1963, being involved in a number of minor contacts. 2 RAR handed over to 3 RAR in August, and returned to Australia. 3 RAR was also committed to operations along the Thai border in early 1964.

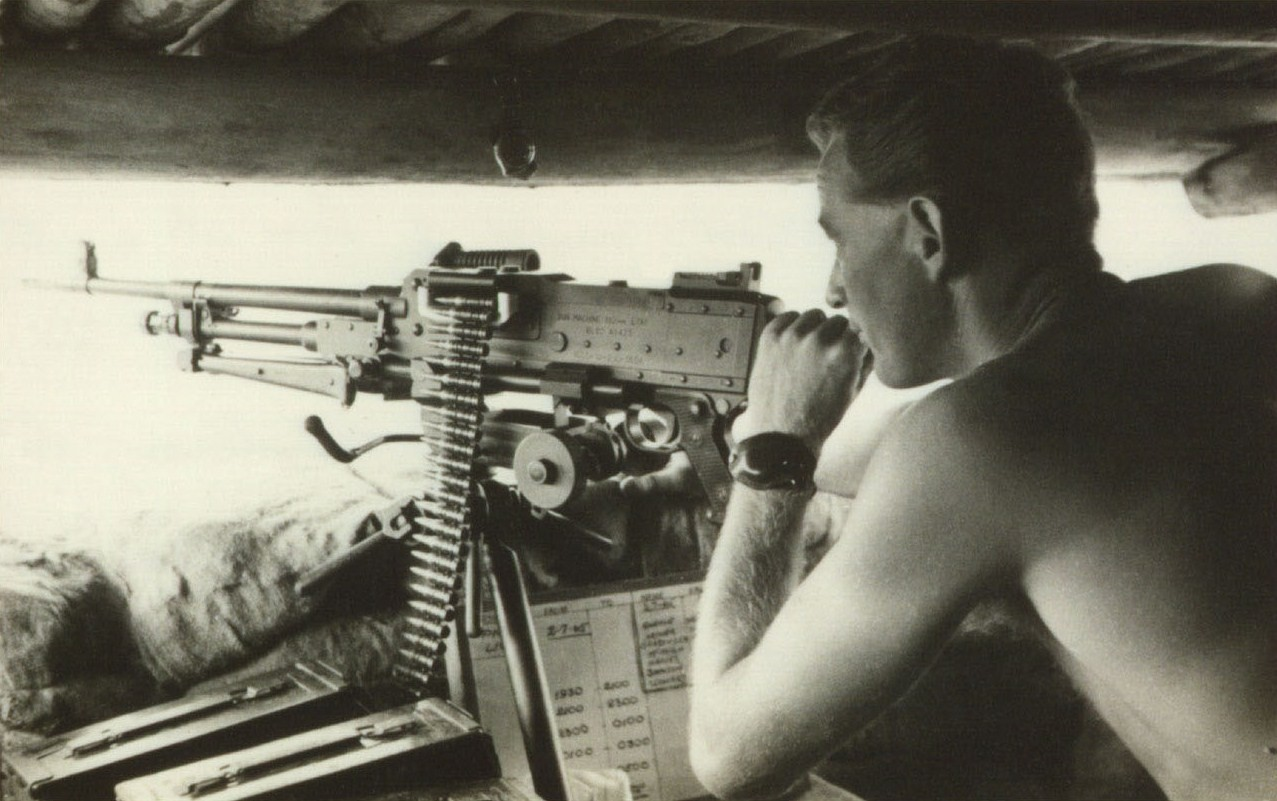
An Australian soldier manning a machine gun position in Borneo, 1965

Between 1963 and 1966, Indonesia pursued a policy of Konfrontasi, or Confrontation, with Malaysia. 3 RAR, which was based at Camp Terendak in Malacca on mainland Malaysia, was subsequently used with British and New Zealand forces to mop up two small airborne and seaborne landings near Labis and Pontian in September and October 1964. On 13 February 1965, 3 RAR was warned for service in Sarawak on the island of Borneo, commencing in March. 3 RAR completed a four-month tour mounting numerous security patrols in its area of operations, including a number of sensitive cross-border patrols into the Indonesian regency of Sarawak as a part of Operation Claret, which resulted in actions at Sungei Koemba, Kindau and Babang, between late May and July. Operations on the Sarawak border "were a severe test of the skill, discipline and professionalism of the infantry, involving long periods in the jungle or in the company bases." Out of the 30 Claret operations conducted by 3 RAR, 12 were reconnaissance patrols, while the remainder were ambushes or fighting patrols, four of which resulted in contact with Indonesian forces. 4 RAR, having been reformed as a battalion the previous year, assumed responsibility from 3 RAR at Camp Terendak in October 1965. Deploying forward to Borneo in April 1966, it remained there until September and like its predecessor, conducted a demanding routine of internal security and cross-border patrols.

=== Expansion of the regiment, 1960s ===
The early 1960s were a period of strategic uncertainty and increasing commitments in South East Asia. Consequently, the Australian government re-introduced selective conscription in late-1964 and directed a significant increase in the strength of the Army. Yet unlike during the 1950s when National Servicemen bolstered the strength of CMF, under the new scheme they would serve for two years in the Regular Army instead. This substantial period of service for the regiment in Australia, Malaysia, and Vietnam saw the government direct the expansion of the regiment from four to nine battalions. By September 1965 the regiment consisted of seven battalions; by July 1966, eight; and by November 1967, nine. 4 RAR was formed in February 1964; 1 RAR abandoned the Pentropic Establishment (1,300 personnel) to revert to the Tropical Establishment (800 personnel), allowing 5 RAR to form in March 1965; 6 RAR was formed from a cadre drawn from 2 RAR in June 1965; 3 RAR assisted the formation of 7 RAR in September 1965; 8 RAR formed in August 1966; and 9 RAR was raised in November 1967.

=== Vietnam War, 1962–1972 ===
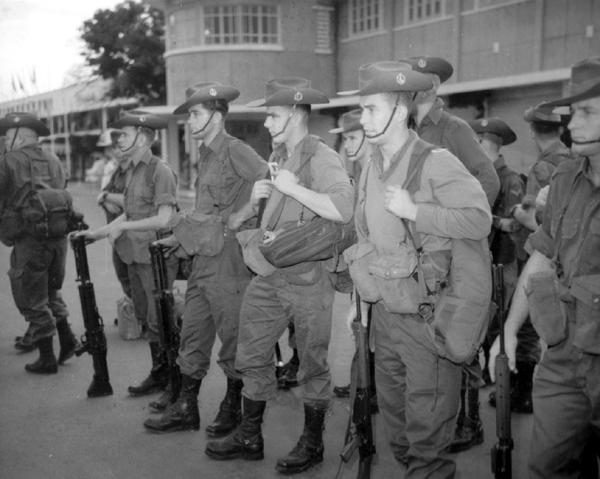
Australian soldiers from the Royal Australian Regiment arrive at Tan Son Nhut Airport, Saigon.

Although individual members of the regiment had served as advisors with the Australian Army Training Team Vietnam (AATTV) since 1962, it was not until April 1965 that the government announced that a battalion would be deployed to South Vietnam. Between June 1965 and March 1972 the units of the regiment would conduct sixteen rotations in South Vietnam, with the first seven battalions completing two 12-month tours, while 8 and 9 RAR would each serve one. Consequently, following a period of hurried training and administration 1 RAR joined the US 173rd Airborne Brigade at Bien Hoa Air Base northeast of Saigon in June 1965. After initially defending the airbase, 1 RAR steadily increased the scope of its patrols. For example, in January 1966, 1 RAR assaulted a large Vietcong (VC) headquarters complex in the Ho Bo Woods as a part of Operation Crimp; which the Americans hailed as the first strategic intelligence victory of the war. The battalion subsequently completed a 12-month-tour attached to US forces, during which it developed new tactics and techniques that later became standard for Australian battalions and supporting arms and services that would subsequently operate in Vietnam.

In March 1966, Prime Minister Harold Holt announced that Australia would increase its commitment to South Vietnam. In May 1966 the newly raised 5 and 6 RAR arrived in theatre as a part of the 1st Australian Task Force (1 ATF) in Phuoc Tuy Province, establishing a base at Nui Dat. After two months of constant patrolling by both battalions, 6 RAR was engaged in the action that would become a defining part of Australia's involvement in the war; the Battle of Long Tan. Fought on 18 August 1966, 108 men from D Company, 6 RAR fought a ferocious meeting engagement with the VC 275th Regiment, possibly reinforced by at least one North Vietnamese People's Army of Vietnam (PAVN) battalion, and D445 Battalion (between 1,500 and 2,500 personnel). After fighting for two and a half hours, D Company was surrounded on three sides. However, with the assistance of strong artillery support they were able to hold their position until the timely arrival of a relief force of infantry and armoured personnel carriers (APCs) finally forced the VC to break. In the words of the official historian, Ian McNeill, "D Company had achieved a stunning victory".

Australian Infantry Battalions in Vietnam, 1965–72
1 RAR	May 1965 – June 1966; April 1968 – February 1969
2 RAR	May 1967 – June 1968; May 1970 – May 1971
3 RAR	December 1967 – November 1968; February 1971 – October 1971
4 RAR	May 1968 – May 1969; May 1971 – March 1972 (D Company only from December 1971 – March 1972)
5 RAR	April 1966 – March 1967; February 1969 – February 1970
6 RAR	May 1966 – June 1967; May 1969 – May 1970
7 RAR	April 1967 – April 1968; February 1970 – February 1971
8 RAR	November 1969 – November 1970
9 RAR	November 1968 – November 1969
Source: Kuring 2004, p. 364

In 1967, 2 and 7 RAR assumed responsibility in Phuoc Tuy from their predecessors and continued the extensive patrolling, and cordon and searches characteristic of this conflict. In August 1967, 7 RAR fought elements of the VC 3rd Battalion, 274th Regiment in the Battle of Suoi Chau Pha, where extensive artillery support again proved decisive. A third infantry battalion arrived in December 1967 as part of a significant expansion of 1 ATF. By the time of the Tet Offensive in 1968, 1 and 3 RAR were serving in theatre. During actions at Fire Support Base (FSB) Coral by 1 RAR and at FSB Balmoral by 3 RAR in May and June 1968, later known as the Battle of Coral–Balmoral, these two battalions of the regiment would fight battles with conventional attributes not seen since Kapyong. In June 1969, an infantry company from 5 RAR, then on its second tour, and supported by a troop of tanks and another of APCs fought a significant combined arms action against a battalion-sized force of PAVN regulars and VC local force troops during the Battle of Binh Ba.

Following Binh Ba, the remainder of the regiment's service would be characterised largely by the policies of "Pacification" and "Vietnamization", with an emphasis on ambushing and patrolling to protect the local population and training South Vietnamese troops to increasingly replace US and allied forces. The withdrawal of Australian forces from South Vietnam began in November 1970 when 8 RAR completed its tour of duty and was not replaced. Where possible, the Australians still sought to bring VC units to battle, such as during Operation North Ward, where V Company, 4 RAR/NZ fought elements of the Chau Duc and Ba Long guerrilla units in August and September 1971. On 18 August 1971, Prime Minister William McMahon announced that 1 ATF would cease operations in October, with the last combat elements of the regiment (D Company, 4 RAR) returning to Australia in February 1972. The regiment sustained losses of 325 killed and over 2,000 wounded in South Vietnam.

=== Peacetime service, 1973–1998 ===
With the withdrawal of the battalion serving in Singapore as part of the Far East Strategic Reserve, 1973 finally saw all units of the regiment stationed in Australia for the first time. Thus began a period of peace-time soldiering of a sort not before seen in the regiment. The end of National Service significantly diminished the strength of the Army, and at this time the government directed that the number of battalions in the regiment be reduced to six, which was achieved by linking 2 and 4 RAR, 5 and 7 RAR, and 8 and 9 RAR. The strength of units and resources were also reduced, with a shift in strategic and tactical concepts from forward defence to defence of continental Australia. Regardless, from September 1973 the battalions of the regiment provided a company on three monthly rotations to Rifle Company Butterworth in Malaysia as part of the Five Power Defence Arrangements. Meanwhile, the 10th Independent Rifle Company, Royal Australian Regiment (10 IRC) was raised on 23 May 1974 to provide an opposing force for units training at the Jungle Training Centre at Canungra.

The 1980s saw the introduction of battalion specialisations—light, parachute, mechanised and motorised—in the regiment and the formation of a ready deployment force. The later concept was first tested during Operation Morris Dance, the contingency mounted in response to the 1987 Fiji coup. 5/7 RAR subsequently developed as a mechanised battalion equipped with M113 armoured personnel carriers, while 3 RAR re-roled as a parachute battalion. In 1988, during the Australian Bicentennial celebrations, a contingent drawn from the battalions of the Royal Australian Regiment under the command of Lieutenant Colonel John Salter of 1 RAR, supported by an Australian Army Band, was deployed as part of the bicentennial celebrations to mount public duties at Buckingham Palace Windsor Castle, St James's Palace and the Tower of London, the first Australian troops to do so since the coronation of Queen Elizabeth II in 1953. In 1991, the two Brisbane-based battalions—6 RAR and 8/9 RAR—then part of the 6th Brigade, became Ready Reserve battalions. Following trials of the concept 6 RAR reequipped as a motorised battalion in 1992, while 8/9 RAR commenced is conversion in 1996. Each battalion was initially issued modified 6x6 Land Rover Perenties until a purpose-built infantry mobility vehicle could be acquired.

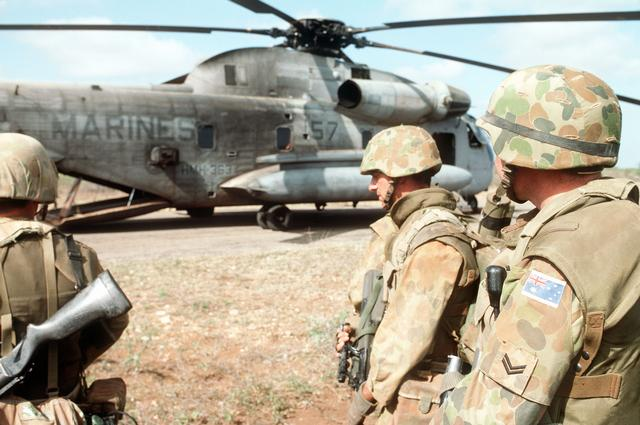
1 RAR soldiers prepare to board a US Marine Corps helicopter in Somalia

Although individual members of the regiment served on deployment in such locations as the Sinai, the Balkans, Western Sahara and Bougainville, it was not until 1993 that the regiment conducted another formed-body deployment. On 15 December 1992 the government announced that 1 RAR would deploy as a part of the US-led and UN-sanctioned Operation Restore Hope in Somalia. The Australian commitment, known as Operation Solace, saw 1 RAR deployed for 17 weeks to a 17,000-square-kilometre (6,600 mi^{2}) Humanitarian Relief Sector (HRS) centred on the township of Baidoa. In the course of four months over 8,311 tonnes of humanitarian aid was delivered. 1 RAR also protected Baidoa airfield, provided security in the township, conducted in-depth patrolling of the HRS, as well as escorting aid convoys within it. 1 RAR was never seriously challenged by the Somali bandits, although there were a number of contacts which resulted in casualties on both sides. One Australian was accidentally killed during the deployment.

In May 1993, a detachment from 12 Platoon, D Company, 2/4 RAR was deployed to Cambodia to provide security to the Australian contribution to the United Nations Transitional Authority in Cambodia. Operating from Battambang airport in north-west Cambodia in support of the Army Aviation Group, they conducted static defensive tasks, patrolling and provided a ready reaction force. They joined another detachment of personnel from 5/7 RAR's Support Company, which had been deployed to undertake communications tasks as part of the Force Communications Unit. The deployment came to an end in November 1993. In 1994, the raising of a fifth battalion was approved, with 2/4 RAR de-linked the following year, and 4 RAR returning to the order of battle in its own right.

Between August 1994 and August 1995, two companies of the regiment, initially A Company, 2/4 RAR and then B Company, 2 RAR, served with the Australian contingent of the United Nations Assistance Mission for Rwanda (UNAMIR). From 20 to 23 April 1995, a 50-member detachment, including infantrymen from 5 Platoon, B Company, 2 RAR were forced to witness the Kibeho massacre of around 4,000 Hutu refugees at the Kibeho camp by members of the Rwandan Patriotic Army. Vastly outnumbered and frustrated by a mandate that did not allow them to engage the perpetrators, the infantrymen were forced into a passive role during the massacre. Throughout the incident, however, they worked under fire attempting to assist wounded refugees. Meanwhile, 8/9 RAR was disbanded in 1997 after the discontinuation of the Ready Reserve scheme.

=== East Timor 1999–2003 ===
East Timor's ballot in favour of independence after 24 years of Indonesian occupation on 30 August 1999 resulted in a wave of violence by militia groups and pro-integration factions within the Indonesian military. 2 RAR and 3 were subsequently deployed from 20 September 1999 as part of the UN-sanctioned International Force for East Timor (INTERFET), charged with restoring peace and overseeing the Indonesian departure. 5/7 RAR joined them in October 1999 once Dili had been stabilised. Despite minor clashes, including a contact at Motaain on the Indonesian border on 10 October 1999, control was quickly established and INTERFET handed over to the United Nations Transitional Administration in East Timor (UNTAET) in February 2000. At this time, 5/7 RAR become the first battalion of the regiment to serve under UN command since the Korean War. From 1999 to 2004, 1, 2, 3, 4, 5/7, and 6 RAR rotated through East Timor (with all bar 4 RAR deploying twice), giving the regiment a wealth of operational experience. One soldier was accidentally killed during these operations, while several more were wounded.

=== Timor Leste 2006–2010 ===
Two years after being withdrawn, the deteriorating situation in the East Timor, now known as Timor Leste—again saw units of the regiment deployed to conduct stabilisation and security operations, this time under Operation Astute. In response to the initial crisis, 3 RAR was deployed along with special forces from 4 RAR and the Special Air Service Regiment (SASR) in May 2006. It was replaced in early September by a combined Australian and New Zealand battle group based on 6 RAR, designated the ANZAC Battle Group. Subsequent rotations included elements of 1, 2, 3, 5 and 8/9 RAR in the years that followed. 8/9 RAR handed over to Army Reserve Task Groups and, after a phased drawdown, the last Australian Defence Force (ADF) elements were withdrawn in 2013.

=== Solomon Islands ===
Events in East Timor largely overshadowed developments in Solomon Islands, where elements of the regiment also served periodically from 2003 onwards with the initial response being provided by 2 RAR. One member of the regiment died during operations in the Solomon Islands. The Regiment subsequently handed over to 2 Div units who saw the mission through to the end.

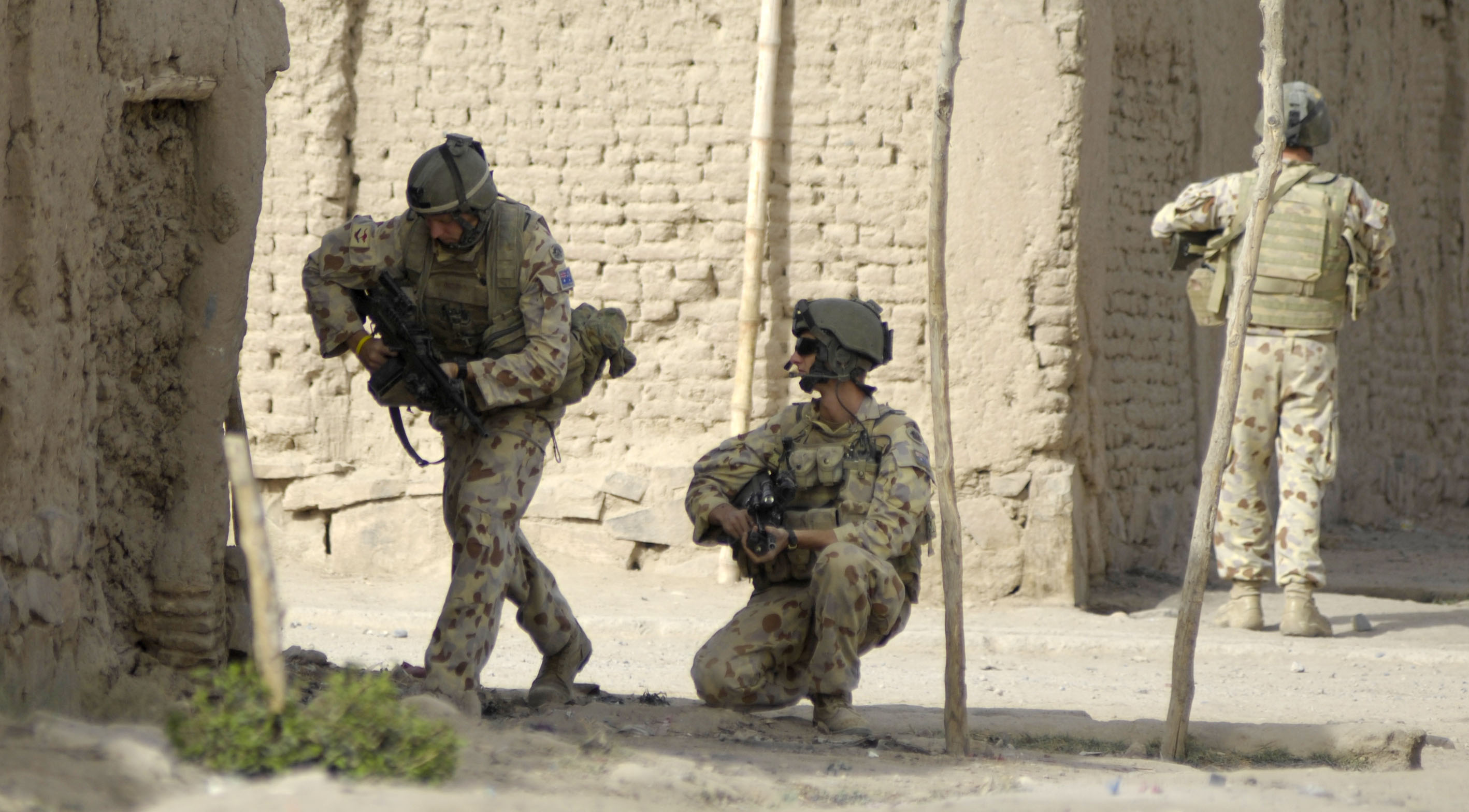
Soldiers from 3 RAR on patrol in Tarin Kowt, August 2008

=== Iraq ===
The regiment had only a minor role in the 2003 invasion of Iraq, providing a force element of about 40 Commandos from 4 RAR to support the Special Forces Task Group, which was based on an SASR Squadron. Following the invasion, the deteriorating security situation in Baghdad saw the deployment of a combined arms Security Detachment (SECDET), charged with protecting the Australian embassy and its personnel. Over a dozen companies of the regiment provided force elements to the various rotations. In February 2005 Prime Minister John Howard committed a battle group to southern Iraq to partially replace a Dutch unit that had been operating in the Governorate of Al Muthanna. The regiment's contribution to the first battle group, initially known as the Al Muthanna Task Group, was a rifle company, although the second and third rotations were led by 5/7 RAR and 2 RAR respectively. When Provincial Iraqi Control was declared in Al Muthanna in July 2006, AMTG 3, led by 2 RAR, was renamed the Overwatch Battle Group (West) (OBG(W)). The fifth battle group to serve in Iraq was based on 5 RAR, by which time OBG(W) was operating in both the Al Muthanna and Dhi Qar Governorates as a part of the British Multi-National Division South East (MND(SE)). (AMTG 1, OBG(W) 2 and OBG(W) 4 were all based on cavalry regiment headquarters). During this time elements of the regiment conducted counterinsurgency operations until withdrawn in mid-2008. Casualties in Iraq included one member of the regiment who was accidentally killed.

=== Afghanistan ===
Meanwhile, a Reconstruction Taskforce (RTF) based around the 1st Combat Engineer Regiment with protective elements from the 5/7 RAR, 6 RAR and 2nd Cavalry Regiment began arriving in Uruzgan Province in southern Afghanistan in early September 2006 as part of Operation Slipper. The RTF formed part of a Dutch-led Provincial Reconstruction Team, operating as part of Task Force Uruzgan and based at Forward Operating Base Ripley, outside of Tarin Kowt. However, as the Australian commitment expanded, by 2010 the task force had evolved into a combined arms battalion-sized battle group consisting of infantry, engineers, cavalry, artillery and logistic elements, usually based on a unit of the Royal Australian Regiment. Known as the Mentoring Task Force (MTF), it formed part of a multinational brigade known as Combined Team Uruzgan and was tasked with counter-insurgency operations in conjunction with United States and other coalition forces. Partnered with the 4th Brigade, 205th Corps of the Afghan National Army (ANA), it operated throughout Uruzgan Province. While attached to MTF-1, soldiers from Combat Team Delta (based on D Company, 6 RAR) took part in heavy fighting during the Battle of Derapet in Deh Rahwod on 24 August 2010. Corporal Daniel Keighran was later awarded the Victoria Cross for Australia for his role in the battle, the first member of the Royal Australian Regiment to receive the award. The task force was withdrawn in late 2013 following the handover of the province to Afghan forces, although a small force protection element remains as part of the ongoing but reduced Australian training and advisory mission. Twelve members of the regiment have been killed in Afghanistan.

=== Special Operations ===
The Special Air Service Regiment owes its heritage to the RAR. Originally formed as the 1st SAS Company in 1957, in 1960 it became an independent company of the RAR and was tasked with providing the army's special operations capability. The SASR became a regiment in its own right on 20 August 1964, severing the link with the RAR at this time. Re-raised as a commando battalion from 1997, 4 RAR (Commando) served in East Timor as a conventional light-role battalion in 2001, before focusing on the development of its special operations capability. In this role the battalion was designed to be a flexible, self-contained force element able to deploy at short notice to undertake offensive operations in support of Australia's national interests. Once full operational capability was reached, elements of 4 RAR (Commando) would serve in Timor Leste, Iraq and Afghanistan, as well as providing a domestic counter terrorism capability as part of Tactical assault group (East). In 2009, 4 RAR (Commando) was renamed the 2nd Commando Regiment, and as such is no longer part of the RAR. Rather than being formally disbanded, 4 RAR remained on the Army's order of battle with its colours and traditions maintained and protected, ready to be re-raised in the future if required.

=== 21st century reorganisation ===
In 2005, the Australian Army began planning for a reorganisation as part of an initiative known as "Hardening and Networking the Army" (HNA). The key impact of this plan on the regiment was that 3 RAR would surrender its parachute role, moving from Sydney to Adelaide to become the Army's second mechanised battalion. However, in August 2006 the government announced that the regiment would expand from five to seven battalions, as part of an initiative known as "Enhanced Land Force" to be implemented together with a modified HNA. As such, 5/7 RAR conducted a de-linking parade on 3 December 2006, reforming as 5 RAR and 7 RAR. 5 RAR reformed in a largely mature state and included a company serving on operations in Iraq, while 7 RAR reformed with a company on operations in Afghanistan. Both battalions remained in the mechanised role. Meanwhile, the regiment marked its 60th Birthday on 23 November 2008 with a parade at Victoria Barracks, Sydney, including a Queens Guard provided by 3 RAR and the Colours of the Regiment. Achieving operational status in 2009, 7 RAR relocated to Adelaide in 2011. Under the new scheme 3 RAR relinquished the parachute role, becoming a light infantry battalion. It subsequently relocated to Townsville in 2012. 8/9 RAR reformed as a motorised battalion at Enoggera on 31 October 2007 in the last element of the Enhanced Land Force, and was equipped with Bushmaster PMVs. It subsequently served on operations in Timor Leste and Afghanistan.

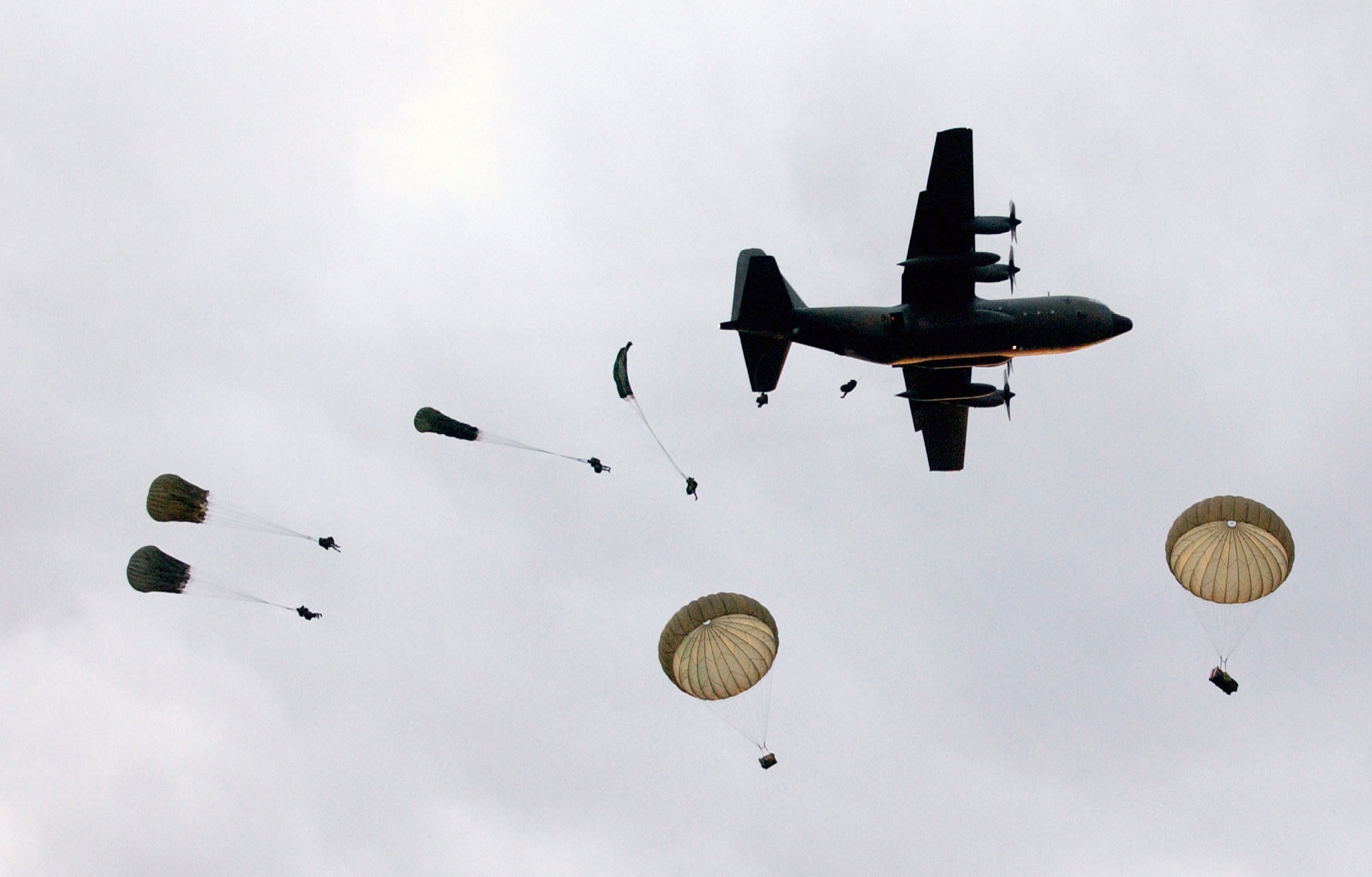
Soldiers from 3 RAR jump from a C-130 Hercules cargo aircraft in 2005

In 2009, the reorganisation was again re-titled, this time as the "Adaptive Army" which sought to re-balance the Army and shape it to become an adaptive, learning organisation. Under the Plan Beersheba element of the Adaptive Army reforms announced in 2011 and confirmed in the 2013 Defence White Paper, the three Regular Army brigades will be restructured between 2014 and 2017 into three Combat Brigades with a similar structure and capabilities, each consisting of: a Brigade Headquarters, an Armoured Cavalry Regiment, two Light Infantry Battalions, an Artillery Regiment, a Combat Engineer Regiment, a Combat Service Support Battalion and a Combat Signals Regiment. With the establishment of the Armoured Cavalry Regiments, 5 and 7 RAR gave up their M113 armoured personnel carriers and re-roled as light infantry. Meanwhile, the motorised battalions also re-roled as light infantry with a transport squadron being established in each Combat Service Support Battalion equipped with Bushmaster PMVs to provide protected mobility. 2 RAR was selected to specialise in amphibious warfare.

In 2017, further changes to the Beersheba Combat Brigade construct were announced known as the "workforce alignment" of Plan Beersheba with the PMVs and M113s again planned to go back to the infantry battalions, with each brigade to include one motorised infantry battalion and one mechanised infantry battalion. Under this plan in 1st Brigade 5 RAR will receive PMVs and 7 RAR will be equipped with M113s, in 3rd Brigade PMVs will go to 1 RAR and M113s to 3 RAR, while in the 7th Brigade 8/9 RAR will receive PMVs and 6 RAR will get M113s. 2 RAR will continue to specialise in amphibious operations.

In 2023, a new defence review saw the implementation of a new structure to the army's combat forces, which saw the Royal Australian Regiment reduced by one battalion through the 5th and 7th Battalions once again being merged to form the single 5/7 RAR, based in Darwin as part of 1st Brigade.

== Theatre and battle honours ==
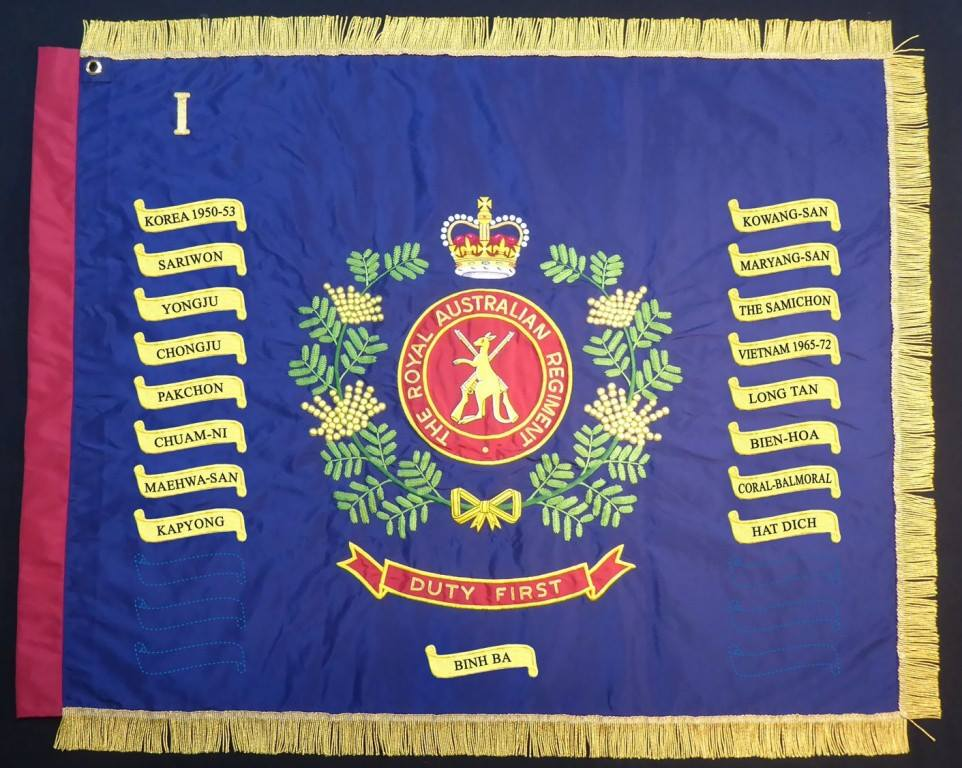
1 RAR's regimental colour

The Royal Australian Regiment has been awarded theatre and battle honours for actions in Korea, Vietnam, East Timor and Iraq.

- Korean War: Sariwon, Yongyu, Chongju, Pakchon, Uijeongbu, Chuam-ni, Maehwa-San, Kapyong, Kowang-San, Maryang-San, The Samichon, Korea 1950–53.
- Vietnam War: Long Tan, Bien Hoa, Coral–Balmoral, Hat Dich, Binh Ba, Vietnam 1965–72.
- East Timor: East Timor 1999–2003
- Iraq: Iraq 2003–11

Battalions	Citation	Steamer	Notes
1st Battalion	Unit Citation for Gallantry		for units who fought in the Battle of Coral-Balmoral.
1st Battalion	Meritorious Unit Citation		20 November 2023, for sustained outstanding service in warlike operations as part of the Unified Task Force on Operation SOLACE in Somalia, over the period December 1992 to May 1993.
1st Battalion	Meritorious Unit Commendation		(United States) for its service in Vietnam
1st Battalion	Gallantry Cross Unit Citation		(South Vietnam) for its service during the Vietnam War.
2nd Battalion	Gallantry Cross Unit Citation		(South Vietnam) for its service during the Vietnam War.
3rd Battalion	Unit Citation for Gallantry		for units who fought in the Battle of Coral-Balmoral.
3rd Battalion	Presidential Unit Citation		(South Korea) following the Battle of Kapyong during the Korean War.
3rd Battalion	Presidential Unit Citation		(United States) following the Battle of Kapyong during the Korean War
3rd Battalion	Gallantry Cross Unit Citation		(South Vietnam) for its service during the Vietnam War.
4th Battalion	Unit Citation for Gallantry		6 October 2007 for operations in Afghanistan.
4th Battalion	Gallantry Cross Unit Citation		(South Vietnam) for its service during the Vietnam War.
5th Battalion	Gallantry Cross Unit Citation		(South Vietnam) for its service during the Vietnam War.
6th Battalion	Unit Citation for Gallantry		18 August 2011 to D company for its actions at the Battle of Long Tan.
6th Battalion	Presidential Unit Citation		(United States) for its actions during the Battle of Long Tan in Vietnam.
6th Battalion	Gallantry Cross Unit Citation		(South Vietnam) for its service during the Vietnam War.
7th Battalion	Gallantry Cross Unit Citation		(South Vietnam) for its service during the Vietnam War.
8th Battalion	Gallantry Cross Unit Citation		(South Vietnam) for its service during the Vietnam War.

== Music ==
The Royal Australian Regiment has a wide variety of regimental music. In addition to regimental quick and slow marches, each battalion has its own set of marches:

- Royal Australian Regiment – Quick: El Alamein (Band); Slow: Infantry Song
- 1st Battalion – Waltzing Matilda
- 2nd Battalion – Ringo (Band); Back in Black (Pipes and Drums)
- 3rd Battalion – Our Director (Band); Hielan' Laddie (Pipes and Drums)
- 4th Battalion – Inverbrackie
- 5th Battalion – Dominique
- 6th Battalion – Spirit of Youth (Band); The Crusaders (Pipes and Drums)
- 7th Battalion – Australaise (Band); Cock o' the North (Pipes and Drums)
- 8th/9th Battalion – Black Bear (Pipes and Drums)

== Lanyards ==
Soldiers of the 5th Battalion, Royal Australian Regiment on Anzac Day in Darwin, Northern Territory, 2013.

Each battalion of the regiment is identified by a different coloured lanyard worn on the left shoulder:

- 1st Battalion – Garter blue
- 2nd Battalion – Black
- 3rd Battalion – Rifle green
- 4th Battalion – Scarlet
- 5th Battalion – Gold
- 6th Battalion – Khaki
- 7th Battalion – Maroon
- 8th/9th Battalion – Slate Grey and Beech Brown (braided)

== Alliances ==
The Royal Australian Regiment is allied with the following regiments:

- Canada – Princess Patricia's Canadian Light Infantry
- New Zealand – 1st Battalion, Royal New Zealand Infantry Regiment
- Malaysia – Royal Malay Regiment
- United Kingdom – Brigade of Gurkhas
- United Kingdom – Grenadier Guards (1 RAR)
- United Kingdom – Coldstream Guards (2 RAR)
- United Kingdom – Scots Guards (3 RAR)
- United Kingdom – The Queens's Royal Hussars (Queen's Own and Royal Irish) (3 RAR)
- United Kingdom – Irish Guards (4 RAR)
- United Kingdom – Welsh Guards (5 RAR)
- United Kingdom – The Highlanders (7 RAR)
- United Kingdom – The Parachute Regiment (8/9 RAR)

== See also ==
- Regimental Square
- Non-US recipients of US gallantry awards
