= Vietnam Forces National Memorial =

Coordinates: 35.287°S 149.143°E

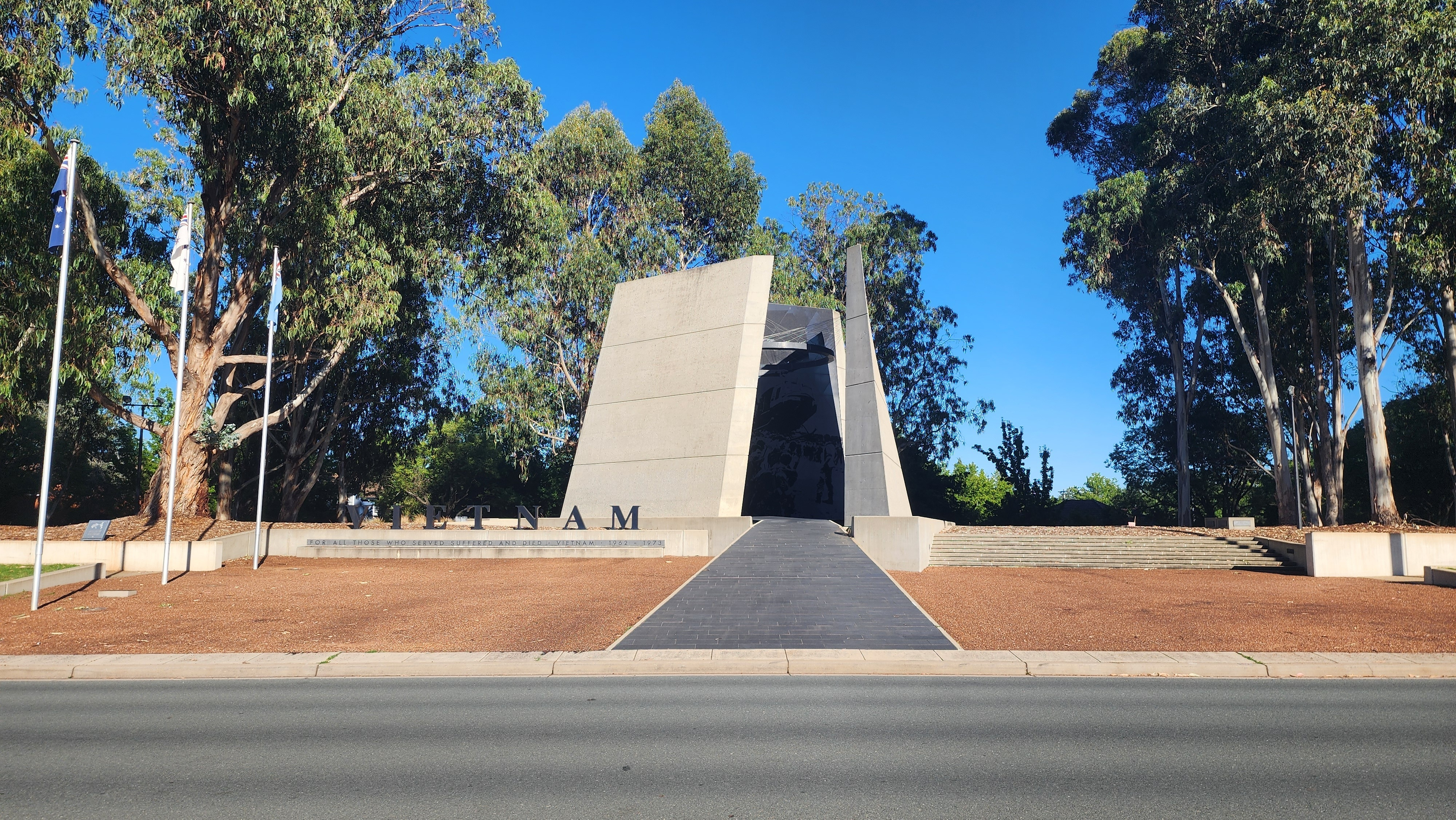
The Vietnam Forces National Memorial

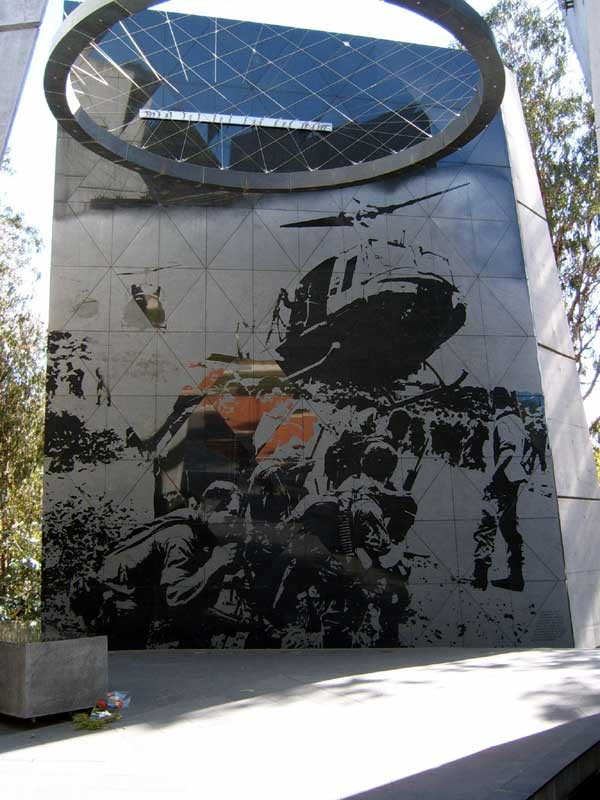
Images on back wall

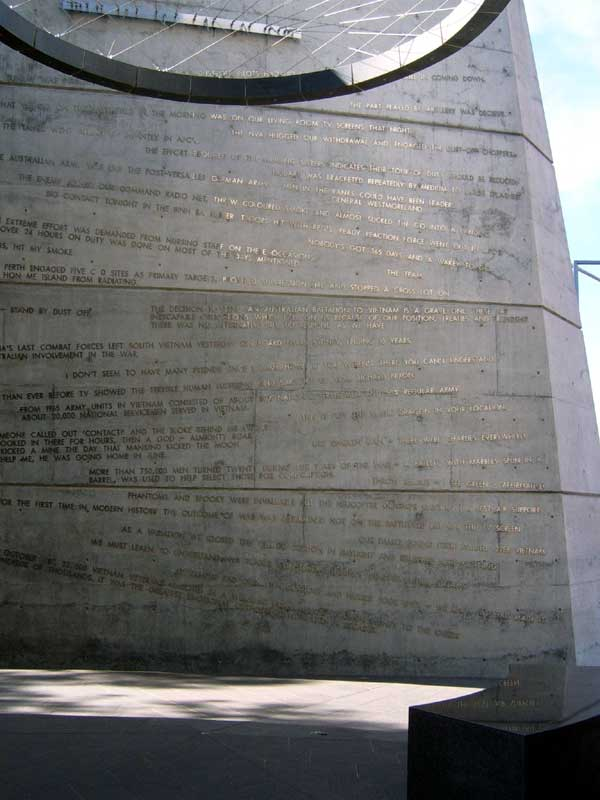
Descriptive phrases on right wall

The Australian Vietnam Forces National Memorial is on Anzac Parade, the principal ceremonial and memorial avenue in Canberra, the capital city of Australia. The memorial was dedicated on 3 October 1992. It commemorates the 50,000 Australian Army, Royal Australian Navy, and Royal Australian Air Force and associated personnel who served in Vietnam during the Vietnam War.

== Design ==
Three concrete stelae, rising from a shallow moat, form the dramatic centre and enclose a space for quiet contemplation.

A low stone block is both a seat and a place for laying memorial tributes.

Fixed to the right wall are 33 inscriptions, quotations intended to recall events of military and political importance. The memorial features a photograph by Australian Army photographer Mike Coleridge - Members of 5 Platoon, B Company, 7th Battalion, The Royal Australian Regiment, 26 August 1967 The photograph, etched on the rear wall, shows soldiers waiting to be airlifted to the Australian base at Nui Dat after Operation Ullmarah. The walls offer anchors for wires that suspend a halo of stones: A scroll containing the names of Australians who died in Vietnam is sealed into one of the stones.

Six seats surround the memorial, each dedicated to an Australian serviceman missing in action in Vietnam.

The memorial was designed by Tonkin Zulaikha Harford in association with sculptor Ken Unsworth AM, and built largely from funds donated from the public to the Australian Vietnam Forces National Memorial Committee.

== See also ==
- Military history of Australia during the Vietnam War
