= United Kingdom in the Korean War =

The United Kingdom was involved in the Korean War between 25 June 1950 and 27 July 1953. 56,000 British troops participated on the side of the United Nations force.

For the war the United Kingdom provided the second largest force behind the United States. For deployment, the Royal Navy arrived on 1 July 1950 whilst the British Army arrived on 28 August. During the war 1,078 soldiers were killed.

After the war some British troops remained as military observers until 1957.

== Order of Battle ==
=== British Commonwealth Forces Korea ===
- British Commonwealth Forces Korea

=== British Army ===
Unit Patch of 1st Commonwealth Division

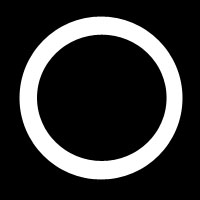
Unit Patch of 29th Infantry Brigade

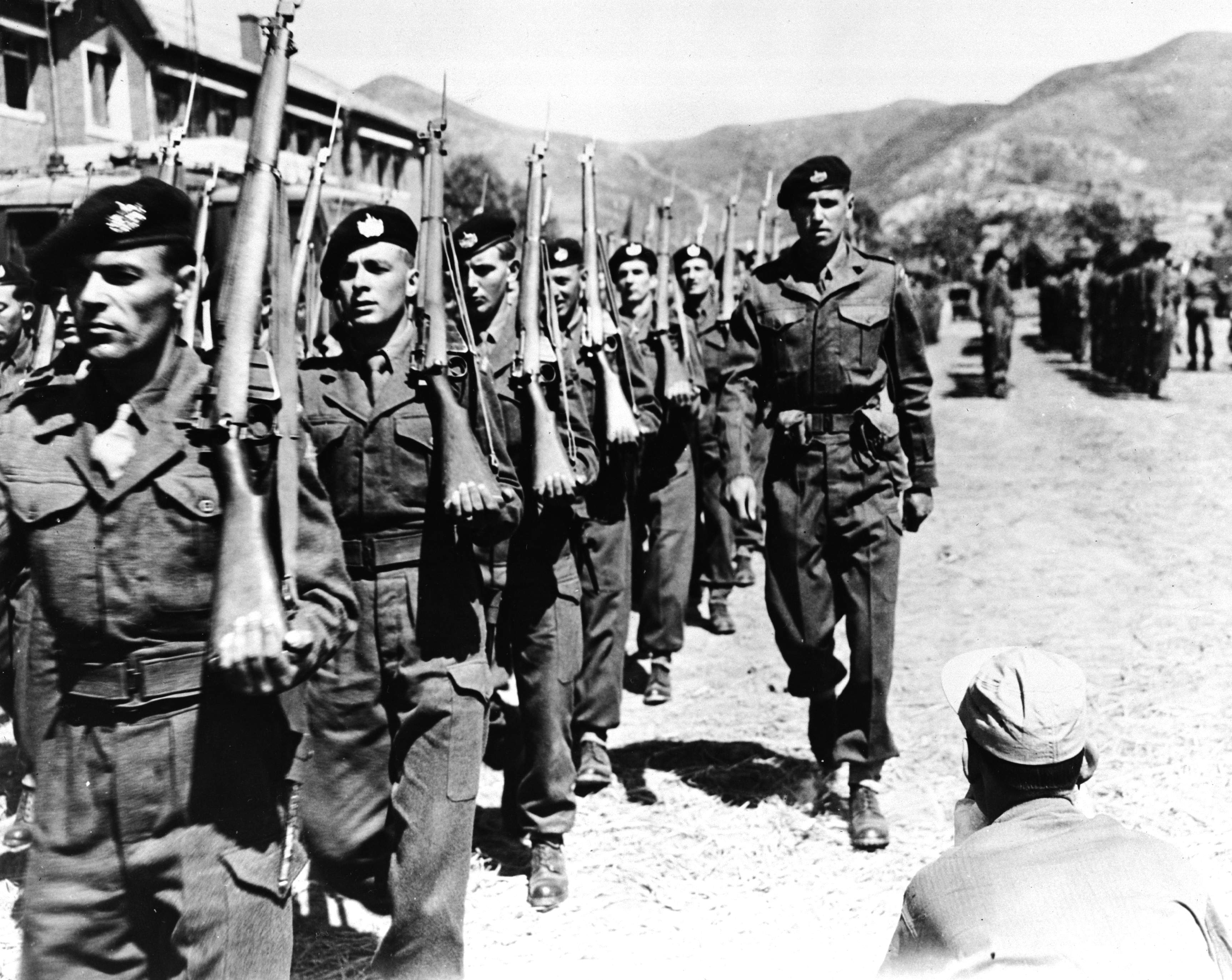
Military Ceremony of British troops after Battle of Imjin River

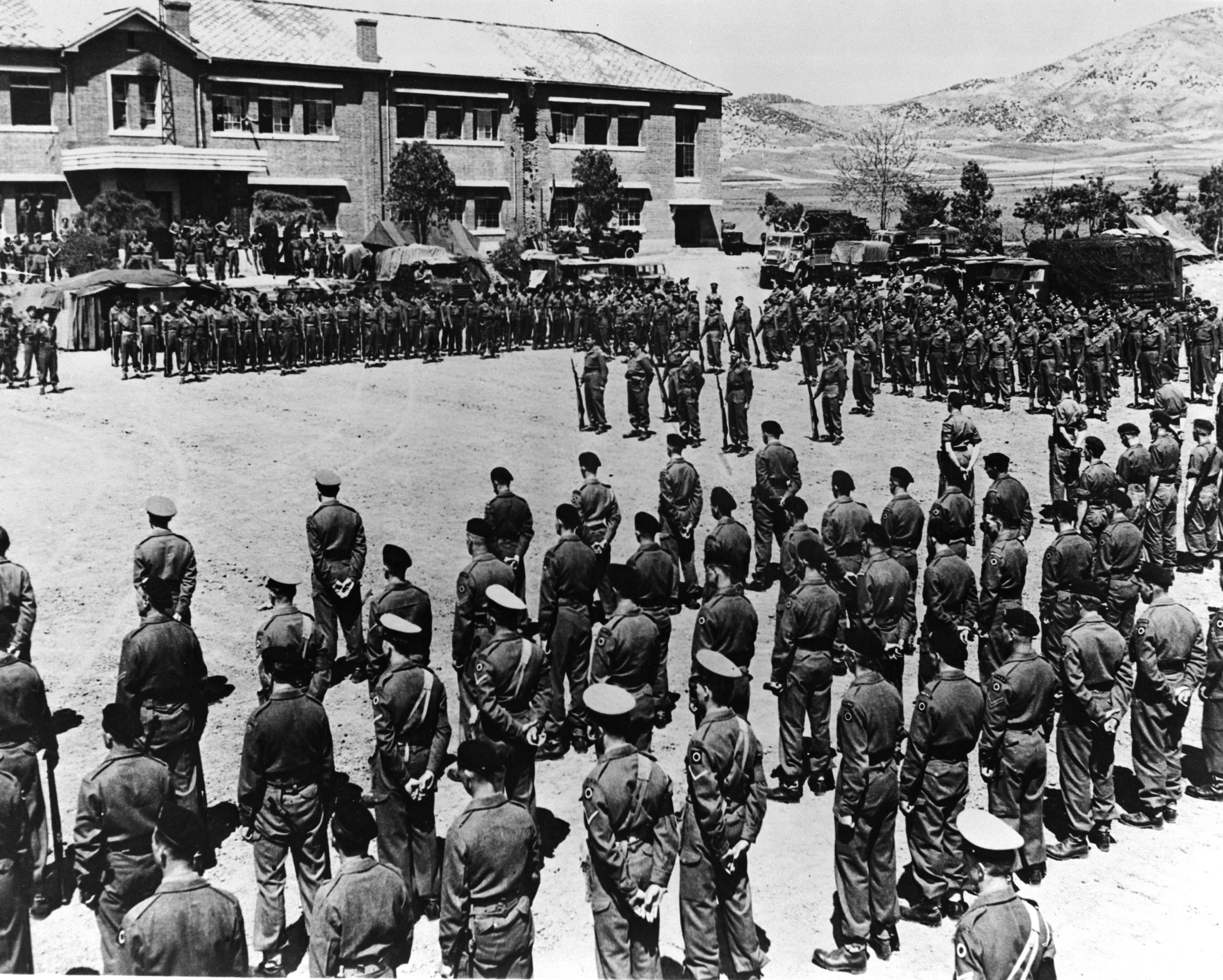
Military Ceremony of British troops after Battle of Imjin River

British Army's order of battle as follows:

- Division:
  - 1st Commonwealth Division
- Brigades:
  - 27th Infantry Brigade
  - 28th Commonwealth Infantry Brigade
  - 29th Infantry Brigade
- Infantry
  - Battalions:
    - 1st Battalion, Middlesex Regiment
    - 1st Battalion, Argyll and Sutherland Highlanders
    - 1st Battalion, Royal Northumberland Fusiliers
    - 1st Battalion, Gloucestershire Regiment
    - 1st Battalion, Royal Ulster Rifles
    - 1st Battalion, King's Own Scottish Borderers
    - 1st Battalion, King's Shropshire Light Infantry
    - 1st Battalion, Royal Norfolk Regiment
    - 1st Battalion, Welch Regiment
    - 1st Battalion, Black Watch
    - 1st Battalion, Royal Fusiliers
    - 1st Battalion, Durham Light Infantry
    - 1st Battalion, King's Liverpool Regiment
    - 1st Battalion, Duke of Wellington's Regiment
    - 1st Battalion, Royal Scots
    - 1st Battalion, Essex Regiment
    - 1st Battalion, Royal Warwickshire Regiment
    - 1st Battalion, King's Own Royal Regiment
    - 1st Battalion, North Staffordshire Regiment
    - 1st Battalion, Royal Leicestershire Regiment
- Cavalry / Armored
  - 8th King's Royal Irish Hussars
  - 5th Royal Inniskillen Dragoon Guards
  - 1st Royal Tank Regiment
  - 7th Royal Tank Regiment
- Artillery
  - 14th Regiment Royal Artillery

=== Royal Navy ===
Royal Navy's order of battle as follows:

- 1st Aircraft Carrier Squadron
  - Aircraft carrier: HMS Triumph, HMS Ocean, HMS Theseus, HMS Glory, HMS Unicorn, HMS Warrior
  - Cruiser: HMS Belfast, HMS Jamaica, HMS Ceylon, HMS Kenya, HMS Newcastle, HMS Birmingham
  - Destroyer: HMS Cossack, HMS Consort, HMS Comus, HMS Concord, HMS Constance, HMS Cockade, HMS Charity
  - Frigate: HMS Mounts Bay, HMS Morecambe Bay, HMS Whitesand Bay, HMS Cardigan Bay, HMS St Brides Bay, HMS Chevron (unsourced)
  - Sloop: HMS Black Swan, HMS Alacrity, HMS Modeste, HMS Hart, HMS Opossum, HMS Sparrow, HMS Crane, HMS Amethyst

=== Royal Marines ===
Royal Marines's order of battle as follows:

- 41 Independent Commando

== Main Battles ==
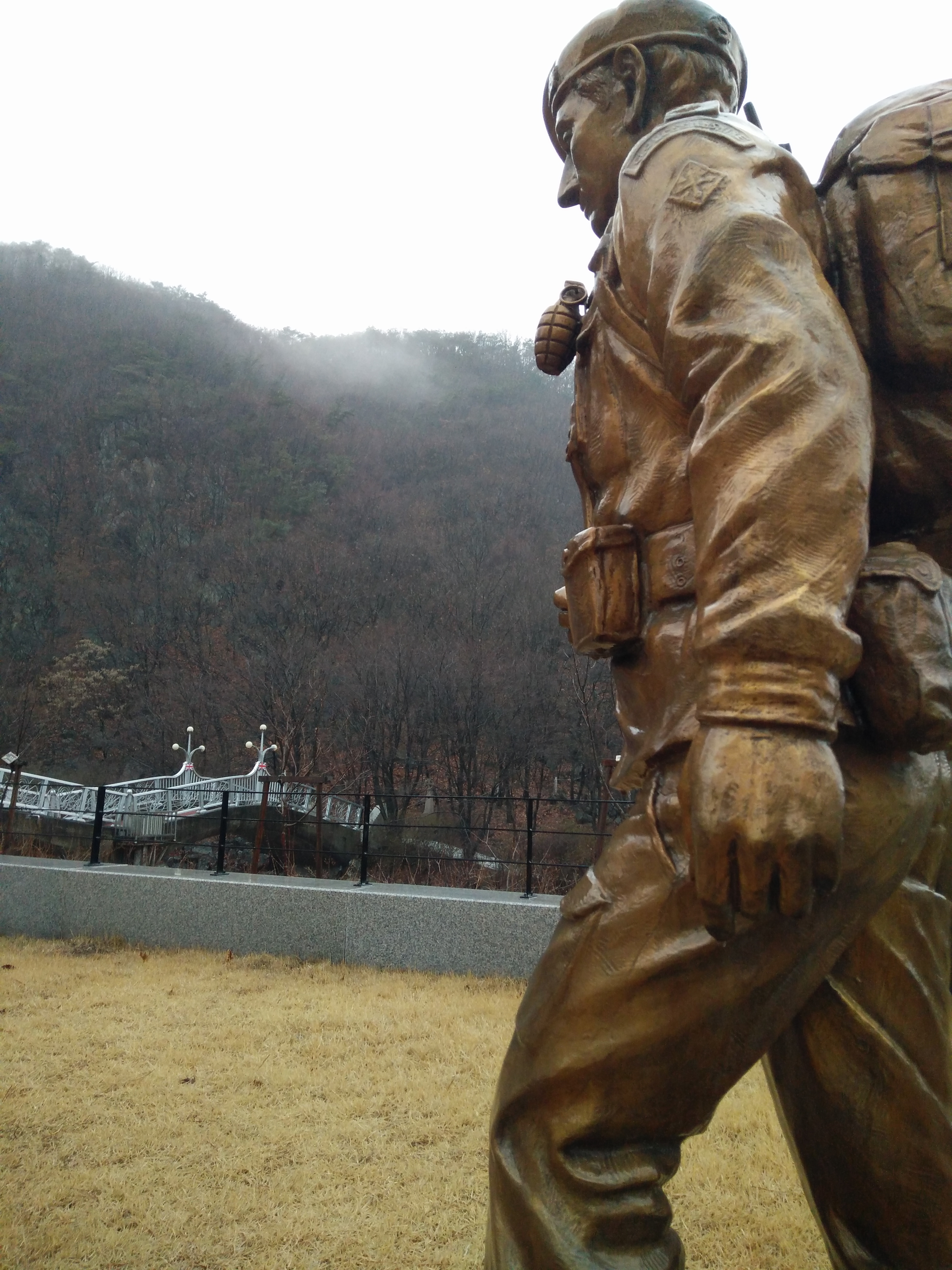
Statue in the Memorial Park for Battle of Imjin River

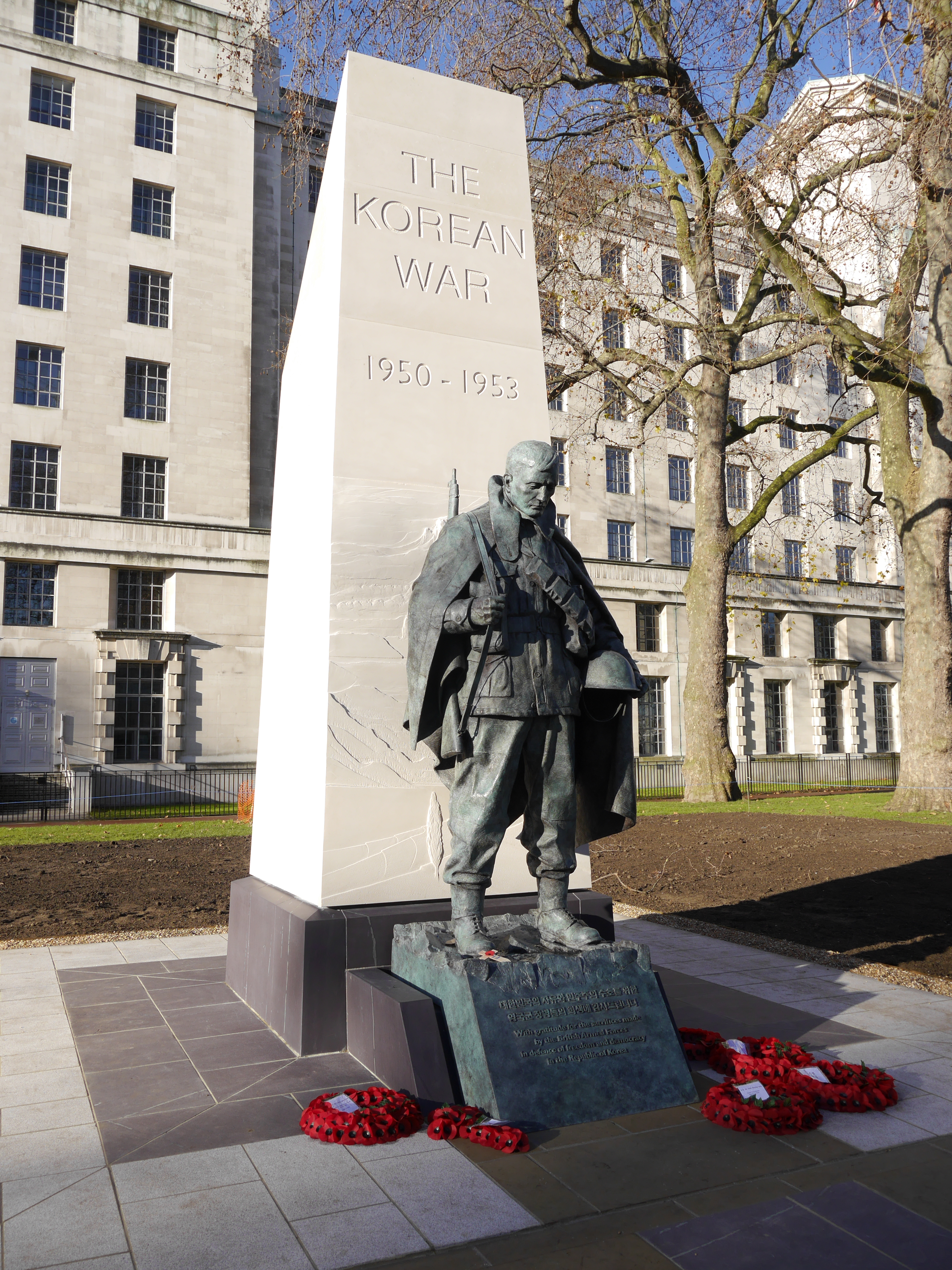
Korean War Memorial in London

- Battle of Imjin River
- Battle of Chaegunghyon
- Battle of Kapyong
- Second Battle of Maryang-san
- Second Battle of the Hook

== Casualties ==
Killed	Wounded	MIA	POW	Total
1,108	2,674	179	978	4,909

Total 81,084 British participated in the Korean War, 886 of 1,078 killed soldiers were buried in the United Nations Memorial Cemetery, Busan, South Korea.

== Memorials ==
There is a Gloucester Hill Battle Monument in the memorial Park for Battle of the Imjin River in Paju, South Korea.

A memorial was opened on the 20th June 2000 in Bathgate in Scotland by the Scotland branch of the British Korean Veterans Association. A more permanent memorial was built on the site, including a pagoda, during 2013. [2]

There is a Korean War Memorial in London which unveiled on 3 December 2014.

== Timeline ==
1950	25 June 1950 – North Korea invaded South Korea, Korean War began; 25 June 1950 – United Nations drafts UNSC Resolution 82 calling for cessation of hostilities, and withdrawal of North Korean Forces. United Kingdom endorses resolution.; 28 June 1950 - United Kingdom decided to join the war.; 2 July 1950 – Royal Navy arrived in Pusan, South Korea.; 28 August 1950 – 27th Infantry Brigade arrived in Pusan, South Korea; 4 September 1950 – 27th Infantry Brigade deployed in Pusan Perimeter; October 1950 – UN Forces crossed the 38th Parallel; 19 October 1950: China People's Liberation Army deployed to North Korea.; 25 October 1950 – First engagement between UN Forces and Chinese Forces.; 17 October 1950 – Battle of Sariwon; 30 October 1950 – Battle of Chongju; 5 November 1950 – Battle of Pakchon; 18 November 1950 – 41 Independent Commando involving Battle of Chosin Reservoir; 2 – 24 December 1950 – UN Forces retreat from North Korea
1951	3–4 January 1951 – Battle of Chaegunghyon; 22–25 April 1951 – Battle of the Imjin River; 22–27 April 1951 – Battle of Kapyong; 4–6 November 1951 – Second Battle of Maryang-san; 4 December 1951 – 41 Independent Commando is withdrawn.
1952	2 January 1952 – Operation Snare; 10 April 1952 – Operation Westminster; July 1952 – British Commonwealth Forces Korea supersedes the British Commonwealth Occupation Force.; 18–19 November 1952 - Second Battle of the Hook
1953	8 April 1953 – Deployed in Jamestown Line; 28–29 May 1953 – Third Battle of the Hook; 24−26 July 1953 – Battle of the Samichon River; 27 July 1953 – Korean Armistice Agreement is signed; 5 August 1953 – Operation Big Switch began, 945 British POWs returned, 1 defector remained in China
1955	March – Royal Navy was withdrawn.
1954–1957	British Army was withdrawn.

== See also ==
- United Nations Forces in the Korean War
- Medical support in the Korean War
- Canada in the Korean War
- Australia in the Korean War
- New Zealand in the Korean War
