= James Carne =

Recipient of the Victoria Cross

James Power Carne
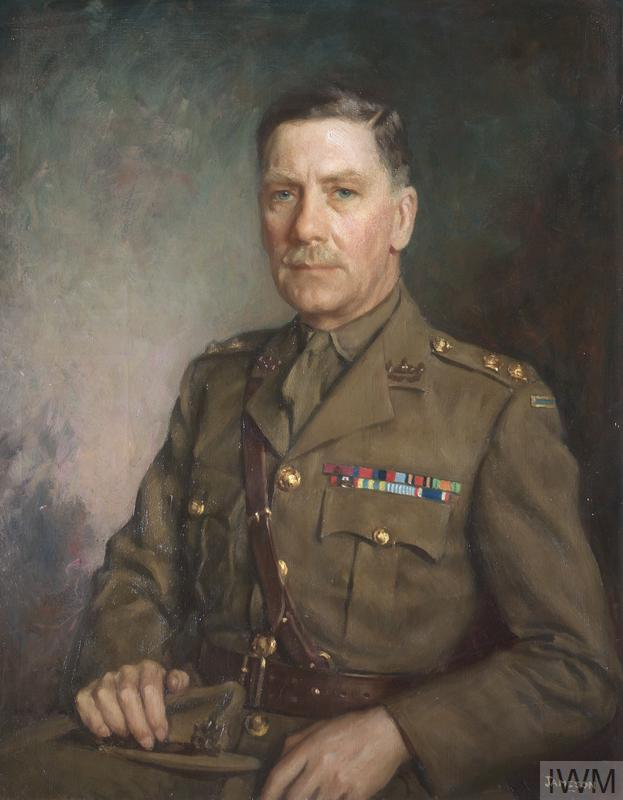
- Born: 11 April 1906; Falmouth, Cornwall, England
- Died: 19 April 1986 (aged 80); Cheltenham, Gloucestershire, England
- Burial place: Cheltenham Crematorium
- Military career
- Allegiance: United Kingdom
- Branch: British Army
- Service years: 1925–1957
- Rank: Colonel
- Service number: 33647
- Units: Gloucestershire Regiment
- Commands: 1st Battalion, Gloucestershire Regiment
- Conflicts: Second World War; Korean War: Battle of the Imjin River
- Awards: Victoria Cross; Distinguished Service Order; Mentioned in Despatches; Distinguished Service Cross (United States)

Colonel James Power Carne VC DSO (11 April 1906 – 19 April 1986) was a British Army officer who served in both the Second World War and the Korean War. He was also a recipient of the Victoria Cross (VC), the highest award for gallantry in the face of the enemy that can be awarded to British and Commonwealth forces, for actions during the Battle of the Imjin River during which Carne led The Glorious Glosters in a famous stand against an overwhelming Chinese attack on Gloster Hill.

== Early life ==
Carne was born in Falmouth, Cornwall on 11 April 1906 the son of George Newby Carne and Annie Emily Le Poar Carne (née Power). His father was a brewer and wine merchant. A career officer, he attended the Imperial Service College in Windsor and later passed out from the Royal Military College, Sandhurst and was commissioned a second lieutenant in the Gloucestershire Regiment on 3 September 1925. He was promoted to lieutenant on 3 September 1927 and to captain on 1 October 1935. Seeing service in the Second World War, he was promoted to major on 3 September 1942. He was promoted to lieutenant colonel on 7 February 1949.

== Korean War ==
Carne was 45 years old and a lieutenant colonel commanding the 1st Battalion, The Gloucestershire Regiment in November 1950 when the regiment was attached to the 29th Independent Infantry Brigade and deployed to Korea following the outbreak of the Korean War. Carne led his battalion as they provided the rearguard to retreating United Nations forces following their defeat at the Battle of the Ch'ongch'on River. He also led the Glosters in a successful counter-offensive launched by UN forces on 16 February south of the River Han.

=== Battle of the Imjin River and Victoria Cross ===
In early April, Carne and his battalion were spread over a 9-mile (14 km) front along the Imjin River guarding a ford which was part of the main route to the city of Seoul. During the night of 22 April, Chinese forces launched their Spring Offensive which was intended to annihilate the British 29th Brigade as well as the US 3rd Infantry Division, thus enabling the capture of Seoul and delivering a crushing blow to UN forces in Korea.

In what became known as the Battle of the Imjin River, Carne's Glosters and the rest of the British brigade were met by an onslaught of over 27,000 Chinese troops attacking in massed waves. Carne's leadership was instrumental in allowing the Glosters to hold their ground during the attack during which the following deed took place for which he was awarded the VC:

On 22/23 April 1951 near the Imjin River, Korea, Lieutenant Colonel Carne's battalion was heavily and incessantly engaged by vastly superior numbers of the enemy. Throughout this time Colonel Carne moved among the whole battalion under very heavy mortar and machine-gun fire, inspiring the utmost confidence and the will to resist among his troops. On two separate occasions, armed with rifle and grenades, he personally led assault parties which drove back the enemy and saved important situations. His courage, coolness and leadership was felt not only in his own battalion but throughout the whole brigade.

By the morning of 24 April, Carne and the surviving Glosters gathered on Hill 235 where he received orders from 3rd Division commander General Soule that the Glosters were to hold their ground and await reinforcements. These reinforcements, however, were forced to retreat 2,000 yards (1,800 m) short of the Glosters' position, leaving the Glosters alone in trying to hold Hill 235 against an entire Chinese division. Both sides fought fiercely throughout the night for control over the hill and by the morning of 25 April, the Glosters still held the hill but had very little ammunition, no hope of relief and no artillery support. Carne requested permission to attempt a breakout and ordered his men to split into small groups and make their way as best they could back to the British lines. Only 63 of his men would succeed in doing this with the rest of the battalion, including Carne, being either killed, captured or wounded. Despite the battalion's effective annihilation, the Glosters' stand earned them worldwide fame as The Glorious Glosters and enabled the rest of the British and American forces to retreat before they too were overwhelmed.

=== Prisoner of war ===
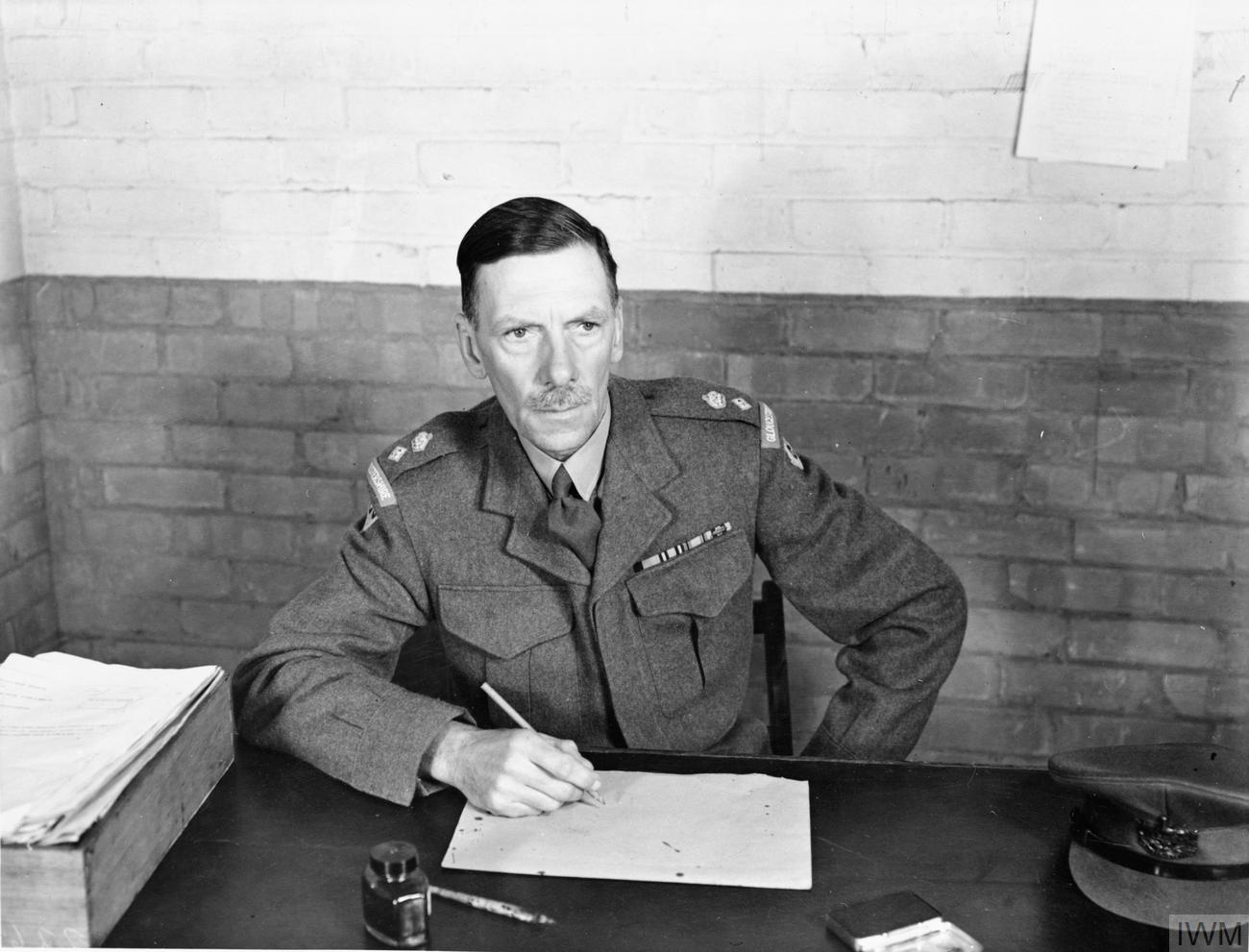
Lieutenant-Colonel James Carne VC pictured in 1953 after his return from the Korean War.

Carne fell into Chinese captivity after his 700-man battalion's resistance against an estimated 11,000 attackers was finally overcome. As the senior British officer among hundreds of prisoners kept in appalling conditions in camps in communist-held Korea, he was singled out for special treatment. While the other ranks were "re-educated" by the communist commissars at their camps, Carne was kept in solitary confinement.

According to documents held at the National Archives in Kew and not made public until 2006, when Carne was released in September 1953 he told Sir Esler Dening, the British ambassador in Tokyo, "an extraordinary story" of brainwashing. "He says that between January 1952 and August this year he was kept in solitary confinement by Chinese communists and subjected to a softening-up process including the use of drugs, [the] result of which was, as he put it, to make his brain like a sponge, capable of receiving any kind of information put into it", Sir Esler told the Foreign Office in a "top secret" category telegram.

The note, which was sent straight to Sir Winston Churchill, in his second term as prime minister, went on: "In March of this year, (i.e. about the time when the communists displayed a new interest in concluding an armistice) various thoughts were put into his mind, and he remains convinced that he was meant to retain these and pass them on to Her Majesty's Government." The thoughts comprised a peace deal not just to end the war in Korea, but to reach a settlement covering the whole Pacific region. Sir Esler opined: "The whole thing might be pure fantasy except for the fact that Colonel Carne could hardly have invented it and does not strike one as that sort of person." The Foreign Office was sceptical about the plot, but suggested that perhaps its aim was to split Britain from its American ally.

== Popular culture ==
In 1954 it was announced that Warwick Productions wanted to make a film The Glorious Glosters starring Alan Ladd as Carne based on a script by Max Trell. However the film was never made. Carne was honoured by South Korea in 2015 when his image was featured on a South Korean stamp issued to commemorate the 65th anniversary of the start of the Korean War.

== Later life ==
Carne settled in Gloucestershire in retirement and died in 1986. He was cremated at the Bouncer's Lane Cemetery, Cheltenham, and buried at Cranham.

== Honours and awards ==
- 13 July 1951 – Lieutenant-Colonel James Power Carne (33647), The Gloucestershire Regiment (missing) is awarded the Distinguished Service Order for gallant and distinguished services in Korea.
- 27 October 1953 – Lieutenant-Colonel James Power Carne, DSO, (33647), The Gloucestershire Regiment, is awarded the Victoria Cross in recognition of gallant and distinguished service in Korea. His Victoria Cross is held by the Soldiers of Gloucestershire Museum, Gloucester, Gloucestershire, England.
- 30 October 1953 – Lieutenant-Colonel James Power Carne, VC, DSO (33647), The Gloucestershire Regiment is given permission to wear the Distinguished Service Cross conferred by the President of the United States for gallant and distinguished services during operations by the United Nations in Korea.

- 28 August 1956 Lt-Col Carne was appointed Honorary Colonel of the 5th Battalion, Gloucestershire Regiment (Territorial Army).

== Bibliography ==
- Salmon, Andrew (2010). To the Last Round: The Epic British Stand on the Imjin River, Korea 1951. London: Aurum Press. ISBN 978-1-84513-533-1.
