= Philip Curtis =

Korean War Victoria Cross winner (1926-1951)

Philip Kenneth Edward Curtis
- Lieutenant Philip Curtis VC.
- Born: 7 July 1926; Plymouth, Devon, England
- Died: 23 April 1951 (aged 24); Gloucester Hill, Imjin River, Korea
- Burial place: UN Memorial Cemetery, Busan
- Military career
- Allegiance: United Kingdom
- Branch: British Army
- Service years: 1944–1951
- Rank: Lieutenant
- Service number: 365680
- Unit: Duke of Cornwall's Light Infantry
- Conflicts: Second World War; Korean War: Battle of the Imjin River †
- Awards: Victoria Cross

Lieutenant Philip Kenneth Edward Curtis VC (7 July 1926 – 23 April 1951) was a British Army officer and a recipient of the Victoria Cross (VC), the highest award for gallantry in the face of the enemy that can be awarded to British and Commonwealth forces. Curtis was posthumously awarded the VC for his actions during the Battle of Imjin in the Korean War.

== Military career ==
Curtis was born in Devonport, Plymouth, the only child of John Curtis, a labourer, and his wife, Florence née Richards. As a teenager he served as a volunteer ARP warden. In 1944 he joined the British Army, but did not go overseas. On 3 May 1946 he was commissioned into the Duke of Cornwall's Light Infantry as a second lieutenant, before being demobilised in 1948 and placed on the reserve of officers.

After the outbreak of the Korean War in 1950, Curtis was recalled to active service and joined A company, 1st Battalion, Gloucestershire Regiment in South Korea in March 1951. In late April 1951, A company was given the task of defending Hill 148 (Castle Hill/Chilsongjeong)(37.964°N 126.92°E), a hill south of Imjin River, over which the Chinese People's Volunteer Army (PVA) were expected to attack, but isolated from the rest of the battalion.

On 22/23 April 1951 during a heavy enemy attack, No. 1 platoon under the command of Lieutenant Curtis, was ordered to carry out a counter-attack which was initially successful, but was eventually held up by heavy fire and grenades. Curtis then ordered some of his men to give covering fire while he himself rushed the main position of resistance. In this charge he was severely wounded but he insisted on making a second attempt. While making another desperate charge he was killed when within a few yards of his objective after throwing a grenade which destroyed the PVA position immediately after.

Anthony Farrar-Hockley, adjutant of the Glosters at Imjin River, witnessed Curtis' solo counterattack. At sunrise a PVA attack was repulsed, but the British position was untenable. Below is part of Farrar-Hockley's account.

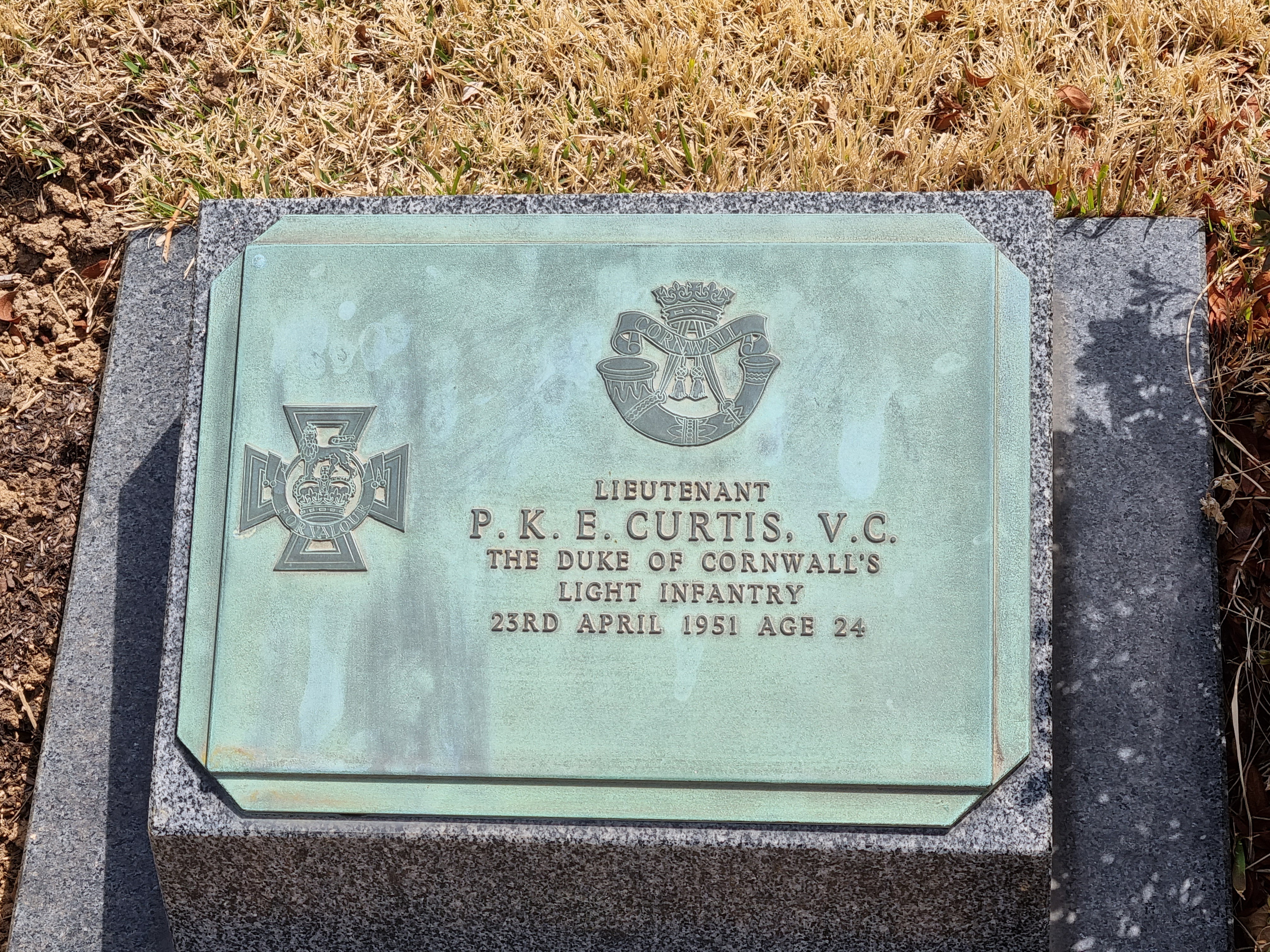
Curtis's grave at the UN Memorial Cemetery

Phil is called to the telephone at this moment; Pat's voice sounds in his ear.

'Phil, at the present rate of casualties we can't hold on unless we get the Castle Site back. Their machine-guns up there completely dominate your platoon and most of Terry's. We shall never stop their advance until we hold that ground again.'
Phil looks over the edge of the trench at the Castle Site, two hundred yards away, as Pat continues talking, giving him the instructions for the counter attack. They talk for a minute or so; there is not much more to be said when an instruction is given to assault with a handful of tired men across open ground. Everyone knows it is vital: everyone knows it is appallingly dangerous. The only details to be fixed are the arrangements for supporting fire; and, though A Company's Gunners [sic] are dead, Ronnie will support them from D Company's hill. Behind, the machine-gunners will ensure that they are not engaged from the open eastern flank. Phil gathers his tiny assault party together.
It is time, they rise from the ground and move forward to the barbed wire that once protected the rear of John's platoon. Already two men are hit and Papworth, the Medical Corporal, is attending to them. They are through the wire safely – safely! – when the machine-gun in the bunker begins to fire. Phil is badly wounded: he drops to the ground. They drag him back through the wire somehow and seek what little cover there is as it creeps across their front. The machine-gun stops, content now it has driven them back; waiting for a better target when they move into the open again. 'It's all right, sir,' says someone to Phil. 'The Medical Corporal's been sent for. He'll be here any minute.'
Phil raises himself from the ground, rests on a friendly shoulder, then climbs by a great effort on to one knee.
'We must take the Castle Site,' he says; and gets up to take it. The others beg him to wait until his wounds are tended. One man places a hand on his side. 'Just wait until Papworth has seen you, sir–'
But Phil has gone: gone to the wire, gone through the wire, gone towards the bunker. The other come out behind him, their eyes all on him. And suddenly it seems as if, for a few breathless moments, the whole of the remainder of that field of battle is still and silent, watching amazed, the lone figure that runs so painfully forward to the bunker holding the approach to the Castle Site: one tiny figure, throwing grenades, firing a pistol, set to take Castle Hill.

Perhaps he will make it – in spite of his wounds, in spite of the odds – perhaps this act of supreme gallantry may, by its sheer audacity, succeed. But the machine-gun in the bunker fires into him: he staggers, falls, and is dead instantly; the grenade he threw a second before his death explodes after it in the mouth of the bunker. The machine-gun does not fire on three of Phil's platoon who run forward to pick him up; it does not fire again through the battle: it is destroyed; the muzzle blown away, the crew dead.

Curtis is buried in the United Nations Memorial Cemetery, Busan, Korea.

== The medal ==
The VC investiture took place on 6 July 1954. Since Curtis's wife Joan had died before the Korean War, the investiture was attended by his mother, his seven-year-old daughter Susan and his mother-in-law, Beatrice Hayes.

His Victoria Cross is displayed at the Duke of Cornwall's Light Infantry Museum in Bodmin, Cornwall.

== Citation ==
The War Office, 1 December 1953:

"The Queen has been graciously pleased to approve the posthumous award of the Victoria Cross to Lieutenant Philip Kenneth Edward Curtis (365680), The Duke of Cornwall's Light Infantry, attached The Gloucestershire Regiment, in recognition of gallant and distinguished services in Korea."

During the first phase of the Battle of the Imjin River on the night of 22/23 April 1951, "A" Company, 1 Glosters, was heavily attacked by a large enemy force. By dawn on 23 April, the enemy had secured a footing on the 'Castle Hill' site in very close proximity to No. 2 Platoon's position. The Company Commander ordered No. 1 Platoon, under the command of Lieutenant CURTIS, to carry out a counter-attack with a view to dislodging the enemy from the position. Under the covering of medium machine guns, the counterattack, gallantly led by Lieutenant CURTIS, gained initial success but was eventually held up by heavy fire and grenades. Enemy from just below the crest of the hill were rushed to reinforce the position and a fierce fire-fight developed, grenades also being freely used by both sides in this close quarter engagement. Lieutenant CURTIS ordered some of his men to give him covering fire while he himself rushed the main position of resistance; in this charge Lieutenant CURTIS was severely wounded by a grenade. Several of his men crawled out and pulled him back under cover but, recovering himself, Lieutenant CURTIS insisted on making a second attempt. Breaking free from the men who wished to restrain him, he made another desperate charge, hurling grenades as he went, but was killed by a burst of fire when within a few yards of his objective.

Although the immediate objective of this counter-attack was not achieved, it had yet a great effect on the subsequent course of the battle; for although the enemy had gained a footing on a position vital to the defence of the whole Company area, this success had resulted in such furious reaction that they made no further effort to exploit their success in this immediate area; had they done so, the eventual withdrawal of the Company might well have proved impossible.

The paper also said that "Lieutenant Curtis's conduct was magnificent throughout this bitter battle".
