= Seolmacheon =

River in South Korea

- Hangul: 설마천
- Hanja: 雪馬川
- RR: Seolmacheon
- MR: Sŏlmach'ŏn

Seolmacheon (Korean: 설마천) is a stream in South Korea. It is a tributary of the Imjin River, which it joins at Jeokseong. It was on Gloster Hill, between the two rivers, that the British Gloucestershire Regiment made their last stand against the Chinese in the Battle of the Imjin River, a major event in the Korean War, from 22–25 April 1951. At the Gloucester Valley Battle Monument (37°56′44″N 126°55′44″E) the British Embassy in Seoul organises a service every April in commemoration.

== Gallery ==
Seolmacheon from Gloster Bridge

Seolmacheon and Gloster Bridge

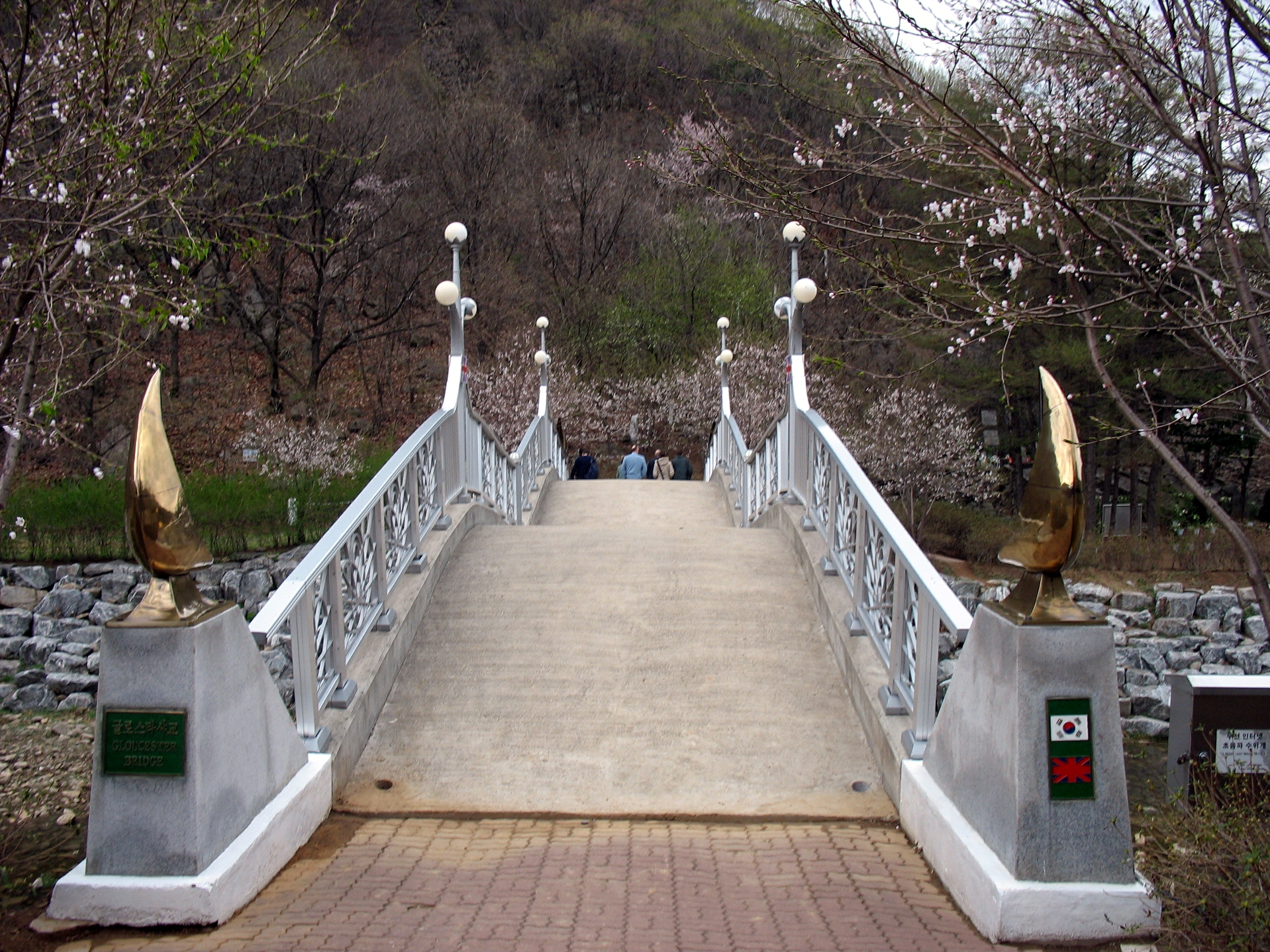
Gloster Bridge

Veterans on Gloster Bridge

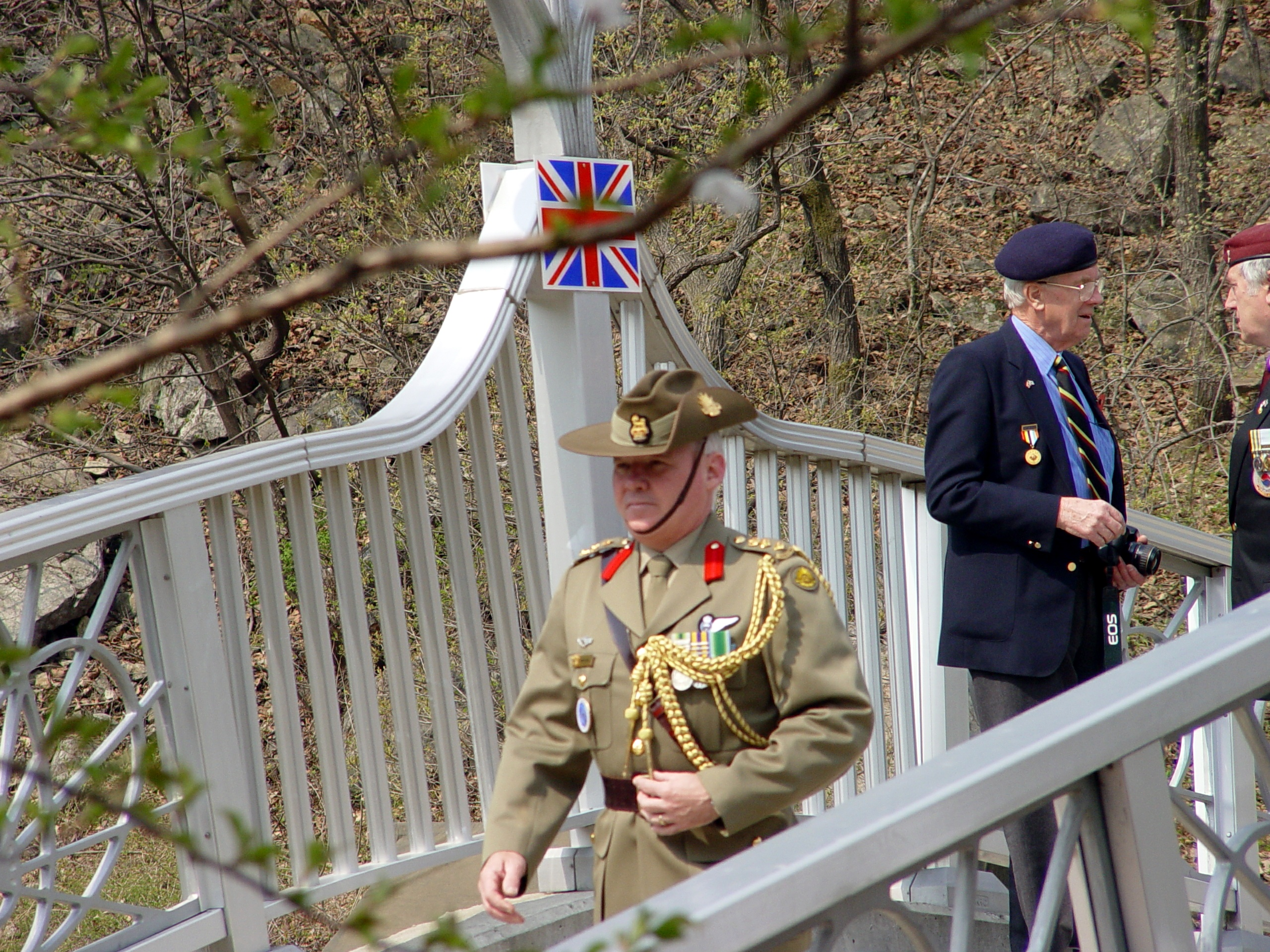
Australian military attaché on Gloster Bridge

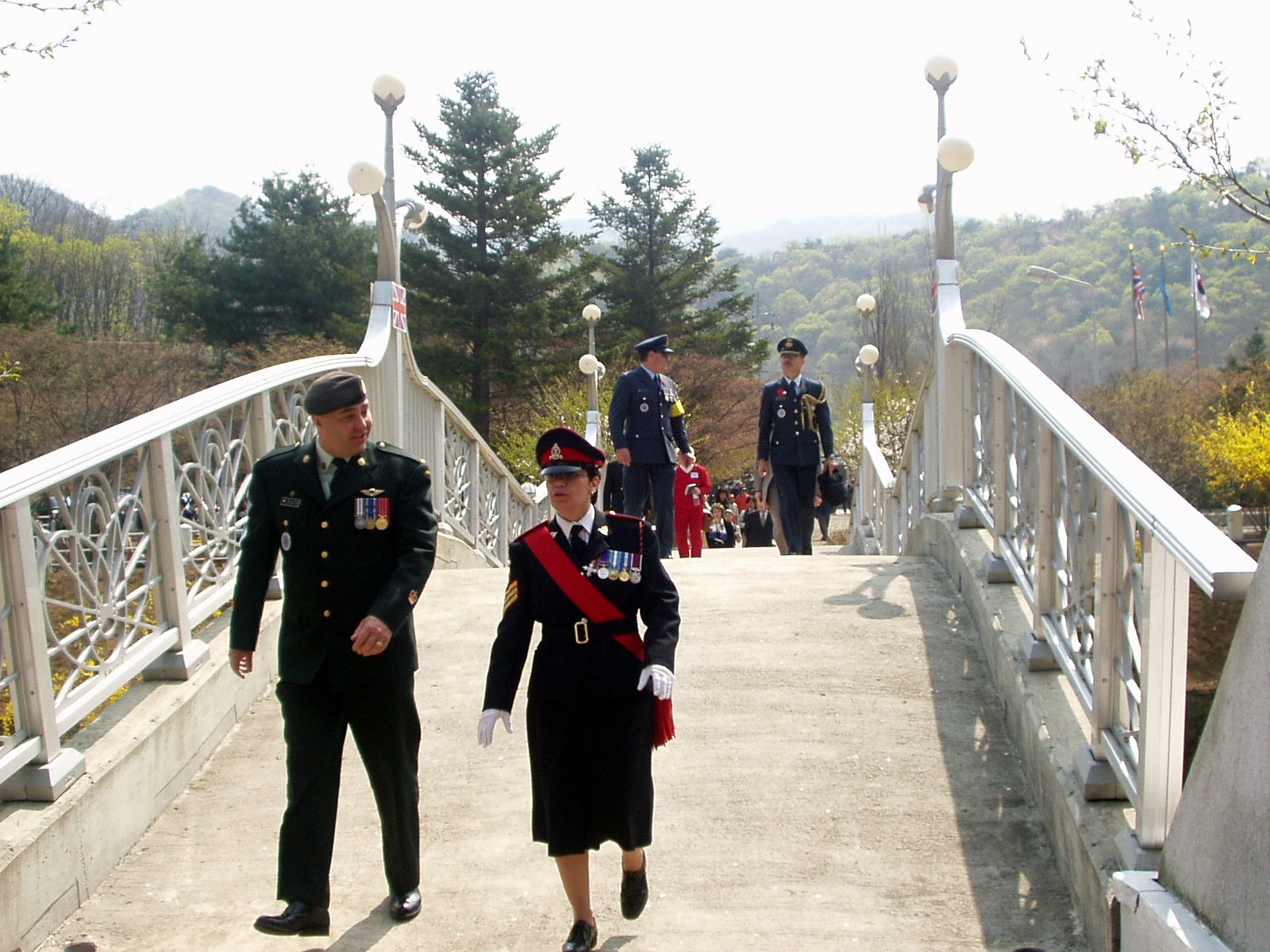
British military attaché and other officers on Gloster Bridge

Korean veterans with a New Zealand veteran by Seolmacheon

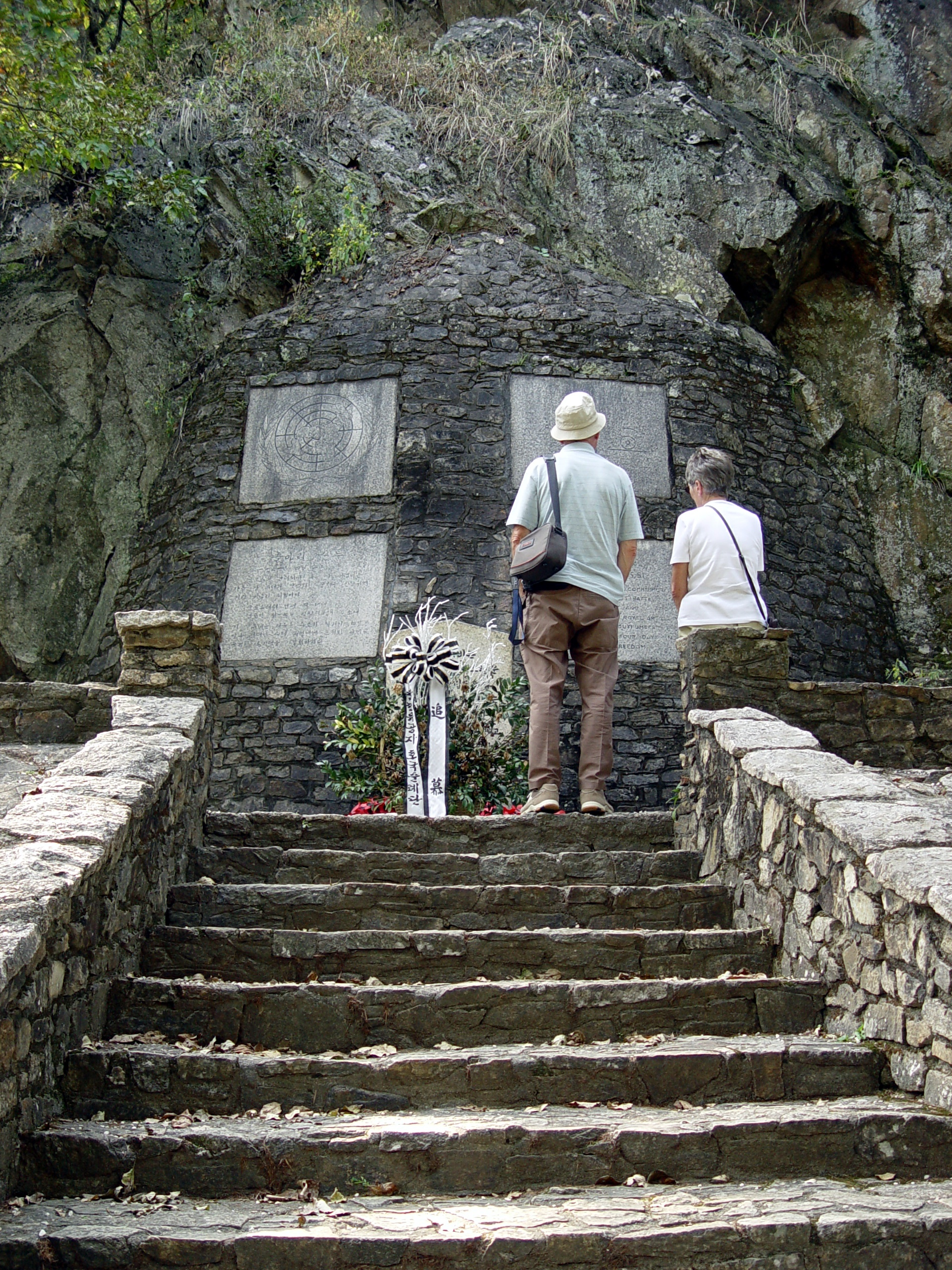
Gloster Memorial by Seolmacheon

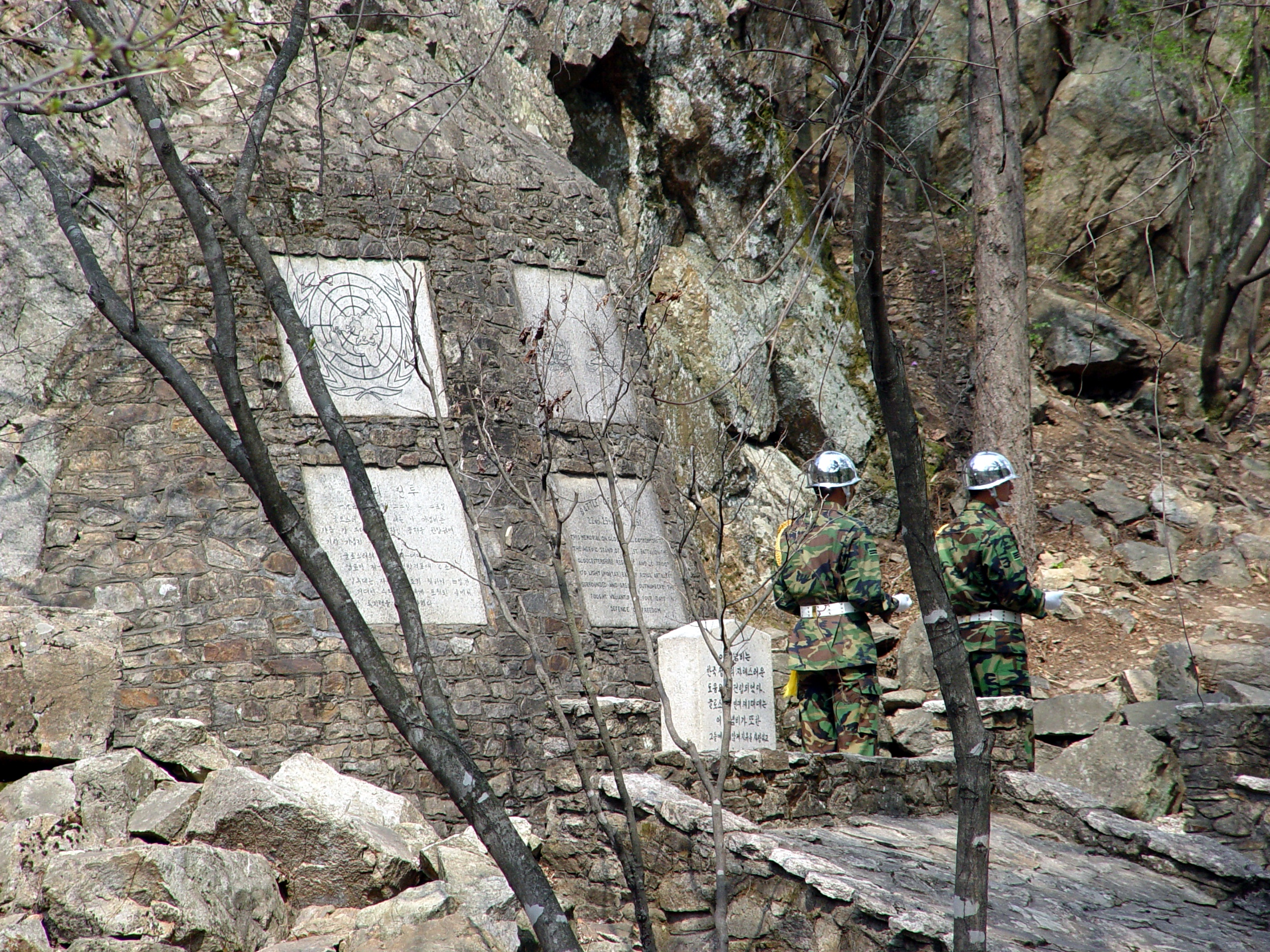
South Korean troops at Gloster Memorial by Seolmacheon

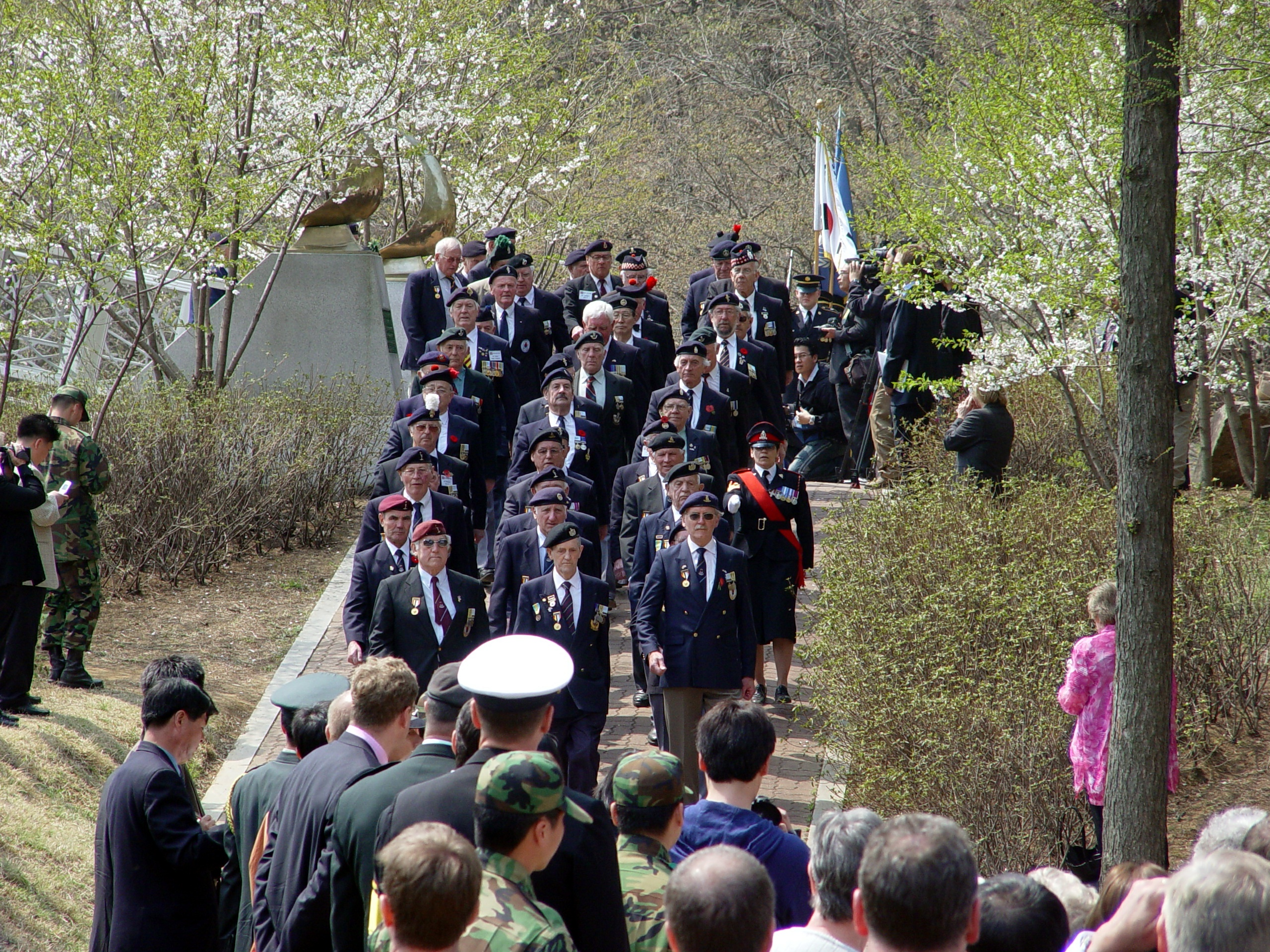
British veterans march by Seolmacheon

Colours paraded by Seolmacheon

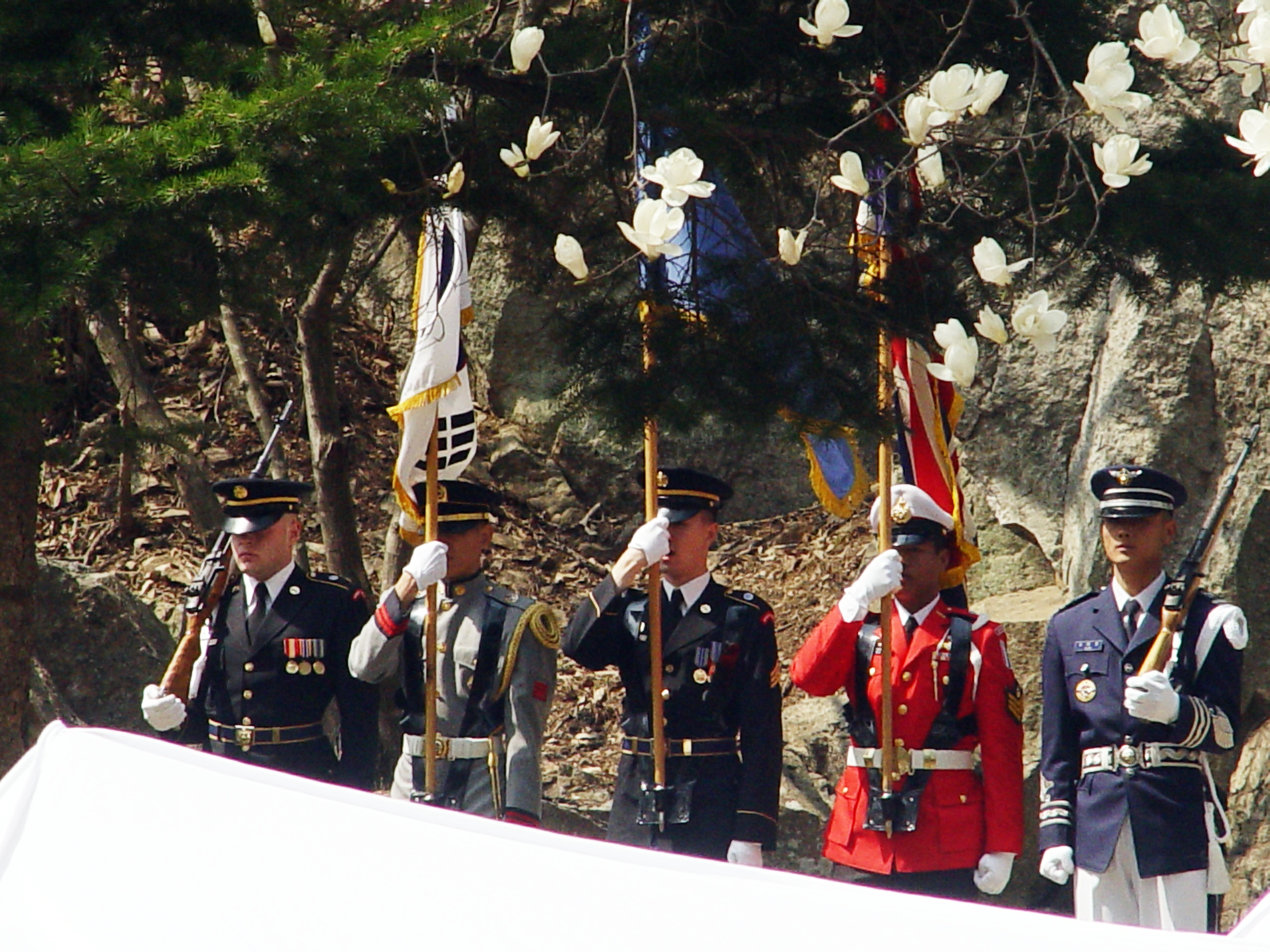
Colours at the Gloster monument by Seolmacheon

Veterans by Gloster monument by Seolmacheon

Flags flying by Gloster Memorial by Seolmacheon

== See also ==
- Gloucester Valley Battle Monument
- Rivers of Asia
- Rivers of Korea
- Geography of South Korea
