= Terry Waters (British Army officer) =

Terence Walters
- Born: 1 June 1929; Salisbury, Wiltshire, England
- Died: 22 April 1951 (aged 21); Korea
- Military career
- Allegiance: United Kingdom
- Branch: British Army
- Rank: Lieutenant
- Nickname: Terry
- Service number: 463718
- Units: West Yorkshire Regiment
- Conflicts: Korean War: Battle of the Imjin River
- Awards: George Cross; Mentioned in Despatches

Lieutenant Terence Edward Waters, GC (1 June 1929 – 22 April 1951), known as Terry Waters, was a British soldier who was awarded the George Cross in recognition of gallant and distinguished services whilst a prisoner of war of North Korea, having been captured at the Battle of the Imjin River during the Korean War. He died whilst being held captive at Pyongyang, Korea.

== George Cross citation ==
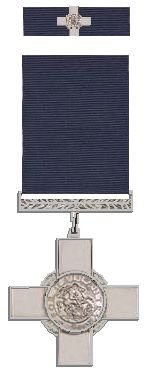
George Cross and its ribbon bar

Lieutenant Terence Edward Waters (463718) (deceased), The West Yorkshire Regiment (The Prince of Wales's Own), attached The Gloucestershire Regiment.

Lieutenant Waters was captured subsequent to the Battle of the Imjin River, 22nd–25th April 1951. By this time he had sustained a serious wound in the top of the head and yet another most painful wound in the arm as a result of this action.

On the journey to Pyongyang with other captives, he set a magnificent example of courage and fortitude in remaining with wounded other ranks on the march, whom he felt it his duty to care for to the best of his ability.

Subsequently, after a journey of immense hardship and privation, the party arrived at an area west of Pyongyang adjacent to P.W. Camp 12 and known generally as "The Caves" in which they were held captive. They found themselves imprisoned in a tunnel driven into the side of a hill through which a stream of water flowed continuously, flooding a great deal of the floor in which were packed a great number of South Korean and European prisoners-of-war in rags, filthy, crawling with lice. In this cavern a number died daily from wounds, sickness or merely malnutrition : they fed on two small meals of boiled maize daily. Of medical attention there was none.

Lieutenant Waters appreciated that few, if any, of his numbers would survive these conditions, in view of their weakness and the absolute lack of attention for their wounds. After a visit from a North Korean Political Officer, who attempted to persuade them to volunteer to join a prisoner-of-war group known as "Peace Fighters" (that is, active participants in the propaganda movement against their own side) with a promise of better food, of medical treatment and other amenities as a reward for such activity—an offer that was refused unanimously—he decided to order his men to pretend to accede to the offer in an effort to save their lives. This he did, giving the necessary instructions to the senior other rank with the party, Sergeant Hoper, that the men would go upon his order without fail.

Whilst realising that this act would save the lives of his party, he refused to go himself, aware that the task of maintaining British prestige was vested in him.

Realising that they had failed to subvert an officer with the British party, the North Koreans now made a series of concerted efforts to persuade Lieutenant Waters to save himself by joining the camp. This he steadfastly refused to do. He died a short time after.

He was a young, inexperienced officer, comparatively recently commissioned from the Royal Military Academy, Sandhurst, yet he set an example of the highest gallantry.
