= Gloucester Hill Battle Monument =

War Memorial in South Korea

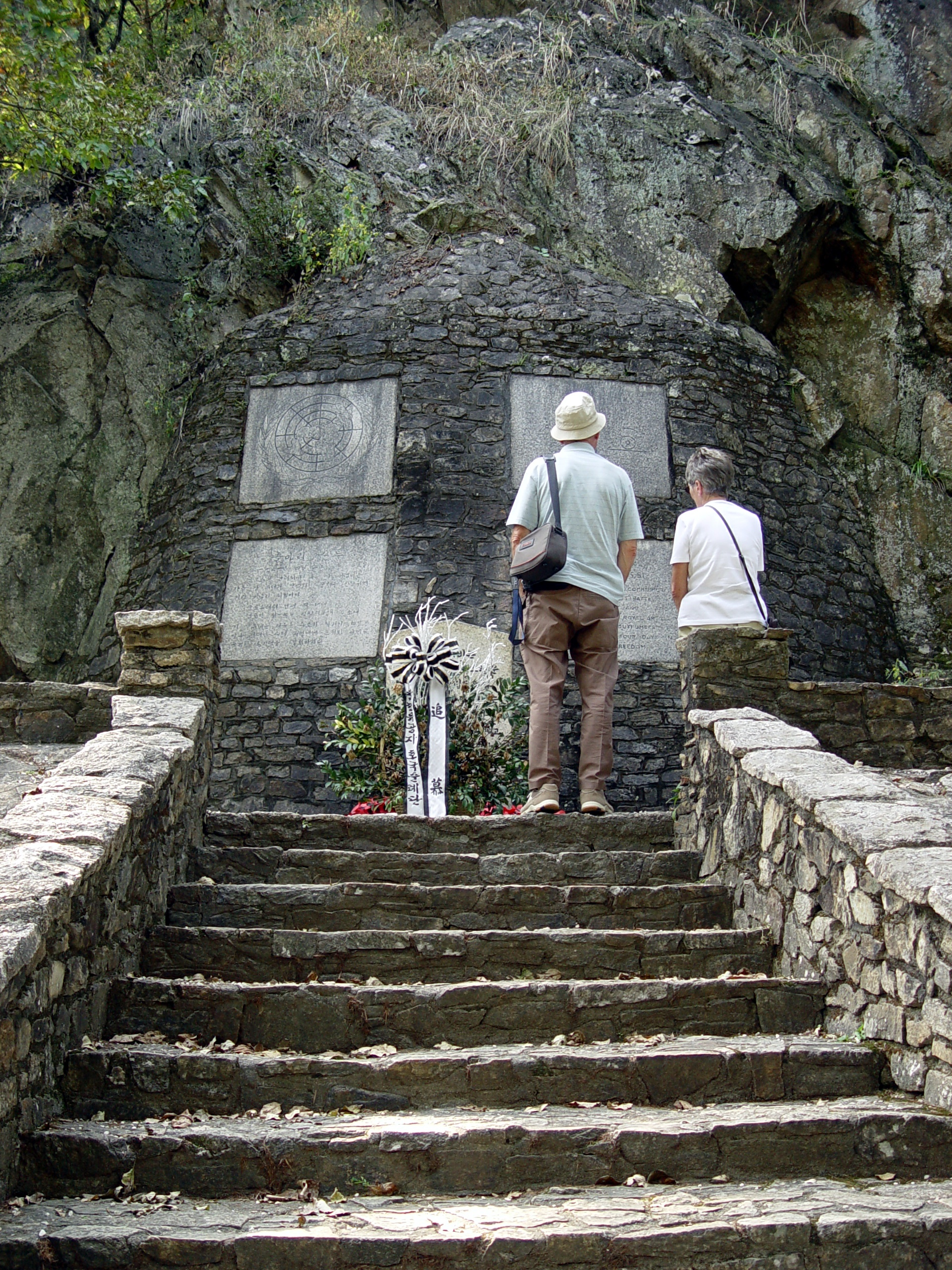

Korean name
- Hangul: 파주 영국군 설마리전투비
- Hanja: 坡州 英國軍 雪馬里戰鬪碑
- RR: Paju Yeonggukgun seolmarijeontubi
- MR: P'aju Yŏnggukkun sŏlmarijŏnt'ubi

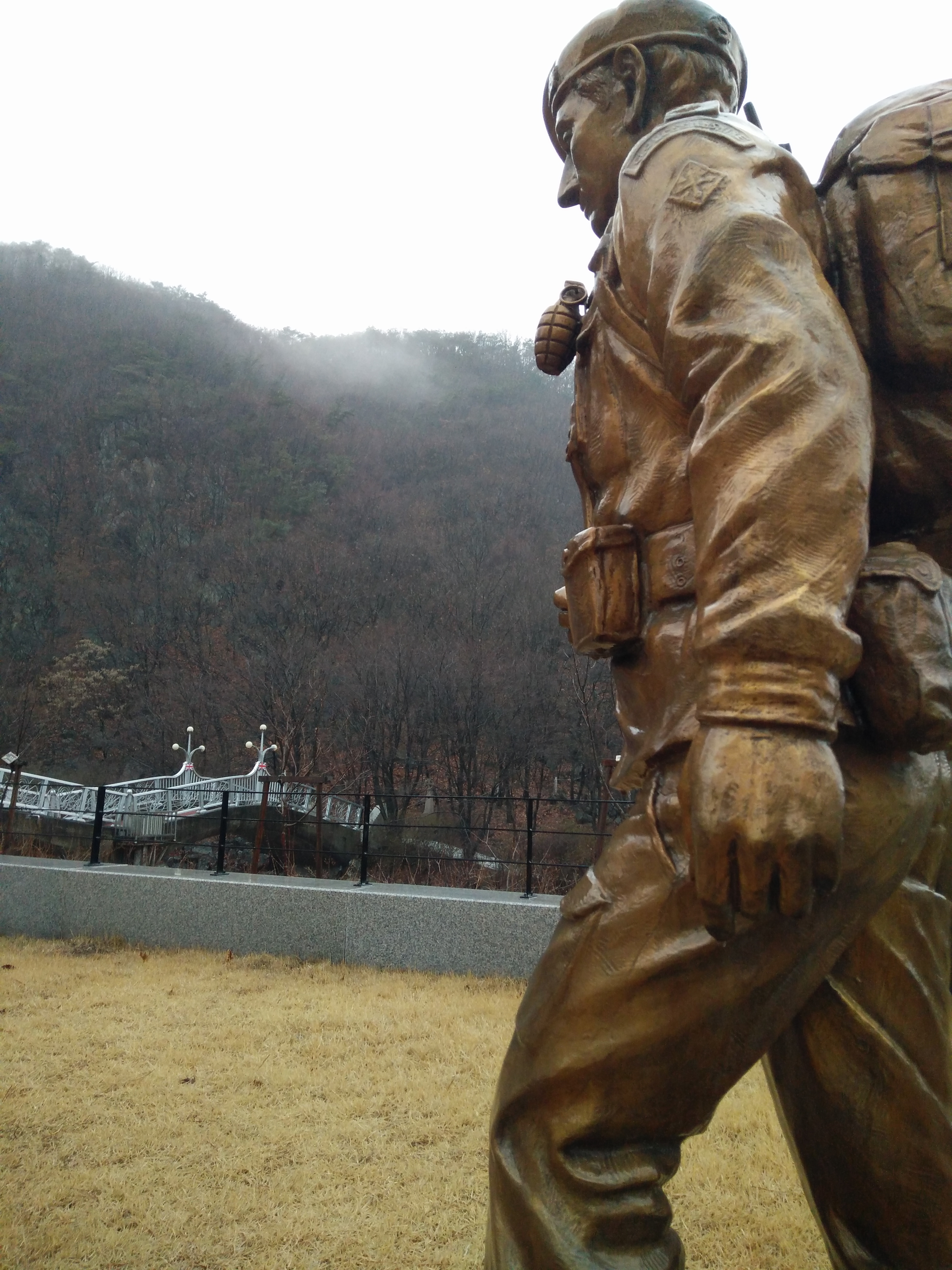
One of the figures in the Gloucester Hill Battle Memorial Park

The Gloucester Hill Battle Monument (Korean: 파주 영국군 설마리전투비, literally "British Army's Seolmari Battle Monument in Paju") or Gloucester Memorial is a memorial in South Korea that commemorates the actions of the Gloucestershire Regiment and C Troop, 170th Mortar Battery, Royal Artillery, of the British Army during the Battle of the Imjin River in 1951.

== Hill 235 ==
Hill 235, where the 1st Battalion, the Gloucestershire Regiment (the Glorious Glosters) was ordered to "Hold on where you are", is remembered as "Gloster Hill". The hill is south of the Imjin River and west of the Seolmacheon stream at 37.945°N 126.93°E in Jeokseong-myeon, Paju City, Gyeonggi-do Province, South Korea.

== Memorial ==
Flags flying at Gloucester Memorial

The memorial stands at the foot of Gloucester Hill beside the Seolmacheon stream, the initial location of the Gloucestershire Regiment's headquarters during the battle at Imjin River. It was built by units of the British and South Korean armed forces as a memorial to the Gloucestershire Regiment and C Troop, 170th Mortar Battery, Royal Artillery.

The British Embassy in Seoul organises services for veterans on every anniversary of the battle, in April. Information on and artifacts from the battle are held by the Soldiers of Gloucestershire Museum in Gloucester, England.

The memorial was first unveiled on 29 June 1957. The memorial park was expanded and reopened in 2014. There is a memorial garden on the east side of the stream containing a large sculpture of the Gloucester's beret, a set of life sized Gloucester soldiers patrolling away from the Imjin River and a memorial wall. The stream is crossed by Gloucester Bridge and a path leads round to a flight of steps that takes you to the memorial stones set into a wall built into the side of the hill.

Four plaques on the original memorial still show the crest of the United Nations, the badges of the Gloucestershire Regiment and of the Royal Artillery, plus inscriptions in English and Korean which read:

Battle of Solma-Ri – April 21 to 25, 1951
This memorial on Gloster Hill commemorates
The heroic stand of the 1st Battalion the
Gloucestershire Regiment and 'C' Troop, 170
Light Mortar Battery, Royal Artillery.
Surrounded and greatly outnumbered they
Fought valiantly for four days in the
Defence of freedom.

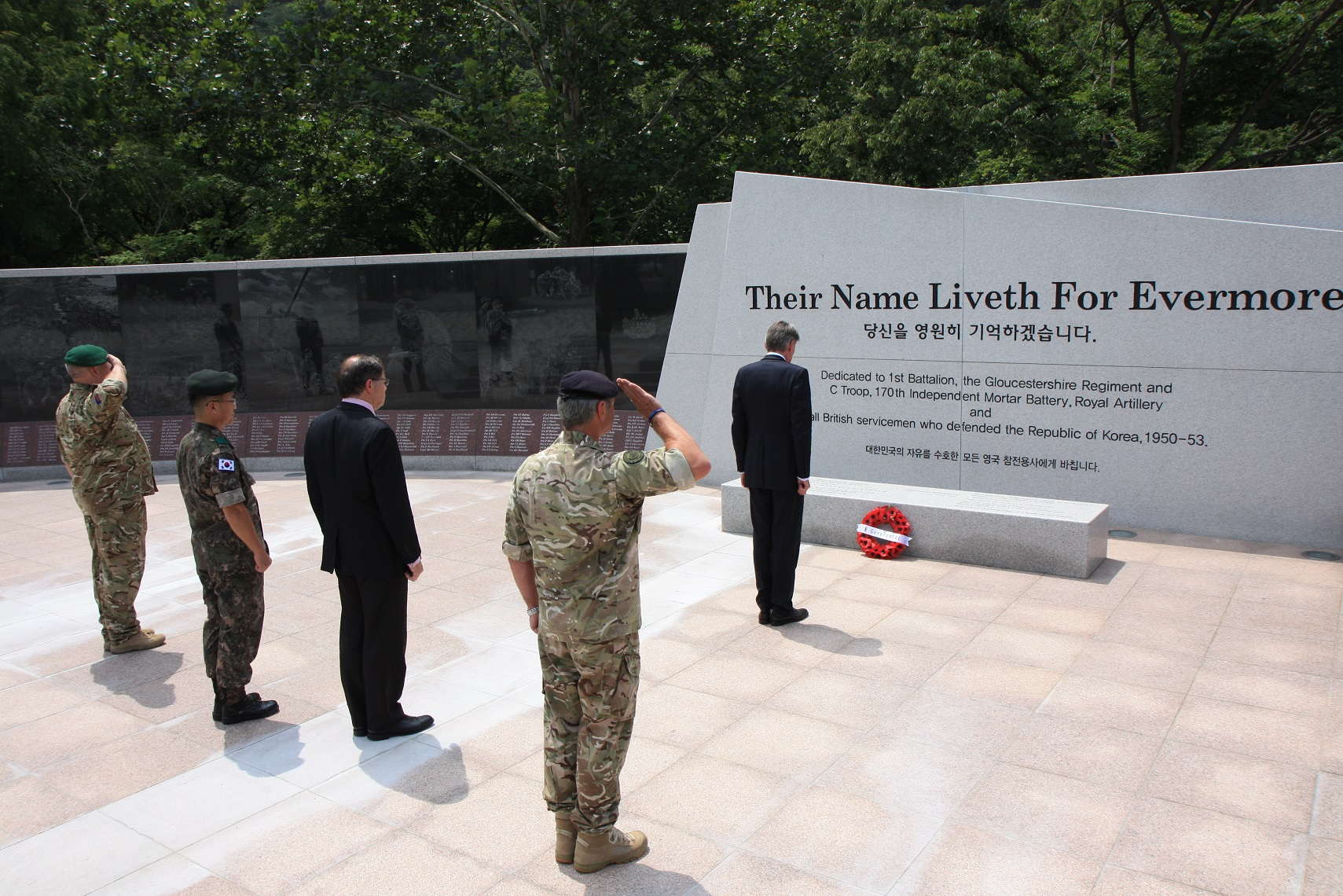
British soldiers and officials pay respects at memorial wall

This is a popular park for local Koreans. According to Lee In-jae, the mayor of Paju who raised money among local citizens to expand the park, "Freedom is not free – it is earned with blood".

1.7 kilometers away from the memorial and situated on Gamak mountain is a rope bridge known as The Gloucester Heroes Bridge. The insignia of the regiment is also on a marble effect wall towards the beginning/end of the bridge, depending on which side the walk is started.

== See also ==
- United Kingdom in the Korean War
- British Commonwealth Forces Korea
- Philip Curtis (VC), British officer killed in the Battle of the Imjin River.
- Anthony Farrar-Hockley, a British full-ranking general and a veteran of the same battle.
- Korean War Memorial, London
- Battle of the Imjin River
