= Hwanggang Dam =

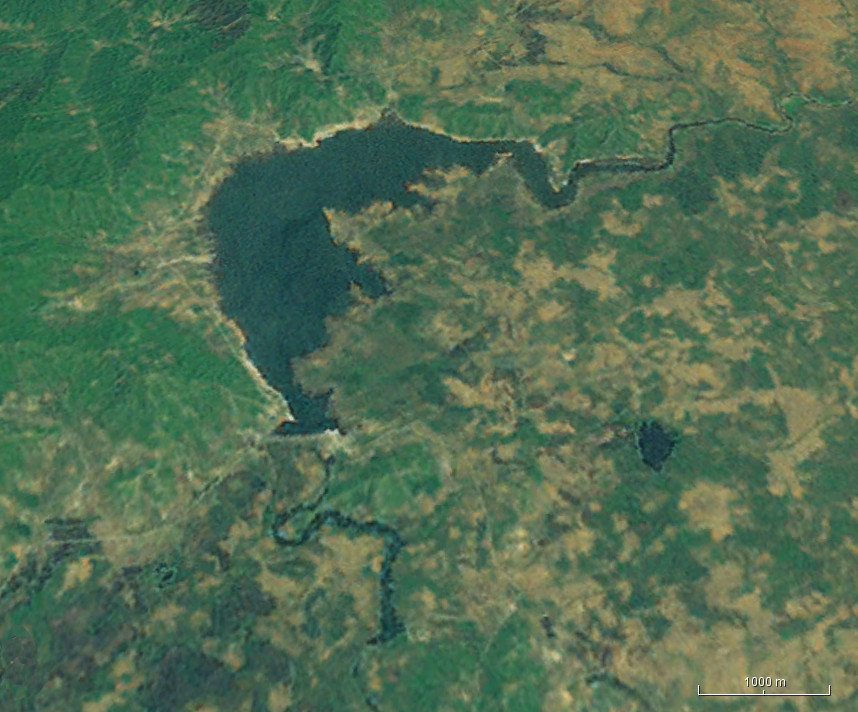
- Interactive map of Hwanggang Dam
- Location: Chorwon County, Kangwon province, Democratic People's Republic of Korea
- Coordinates: 38.3680°N 126.7827°E
- Construction began: 2002
- Opening date: 2007

Dam and spillways
- Impounds: Imjin River

Hwanggang Dam (Korean: 황강댐) is a hydroelectric dam on the Imjin River in Tosan County, North Korea. Located about 26 miles (42 km) north of the Korean Demilitarized Zone, the dam has an estimated capacity of 400,000,000 short tons (360,000,000 t). Construction began in 2002 and was completed in 2007. The stated aims of the project are to generate hydropower and provide water for crop irrigation.

However it is also widely thought that the dam is to protect against the perceived North Korea / South Korea threat. South Korea also built two of its own dams in the area in the early 2010s.

== Flooding ==
In September 2009, without warning, North Korea released a massive amount of water from the dam, causing large floods in South Korea which killed a total of six people. An estimated 40,000,000 short tons (36,000,000 t) of water was dumped during the flood, causing the water level at the border of Gyeonggi-do to leap from 7.5 feet (2.3 m) to 15.1 feet (4.6 m).
