= Battle of Chaegunghyon =

1951 battle of the Korean War

- Part of Korean War
Date	3–4 January 1951
Location	Yangju
Result	UN victory

Belligerents
United Nations: United Kingdom	China

Commanders and leaders
Major Tony Blake + Captain Donald Astley-Cooper +	

Units involved
(United Kingdom) Royal Ulster Rifles (United Kingdom) 8th King's Royal Irish Hussars	Unknown

Casualties and losses
~200 killed or captured 10 tanks	Unknown

The Battle of Chaegunghyon or the Battle of Happy Valley was an engagement in the Korean War fought in Yangju by the Chinese People's Volunteer Army (PVA) and the United Nations Command (UN) forces. The Battle of Chaegunghyon took place on the night of 3–4 January 1951 and held back the advancing Chinese and North Korean forces, helping to facilitate the evacuation of Seoul.

Chaegunghyon is currently near Samha-ri, Jangheung-myeon, Yangju

== Background ==
In December 1950, having been swept from North Korea by a shock Chinese offensive, defeated UN forces stood at bay in the South. On New Year's Day, 1951, the PVA stormed over the border and South Korean forces disintegrated. As a result, Britain's 29th Infantry Brigade was thrust into the line near Yangju and Koyang, 12 miles (19 km) northwest of Seoul.

== Battle ==
Amid blizzards, the brigade dug a shaky line over the hills. On the left flank, reinforced by ten 8th Hussars Cromwell tanks (Cooper Force), stood the Royal Ulster Rifles (RUR). By 3 January there was nothing between them and the onrushing PVA. Before dawn that day, indistinct figures appeared in front of the RUR trenches. A patrol descended into the valley and men on the hills heard a staccato burst of gunfire - then silence. The patrol had blundered into the main assault force and from nowhere the PVA broke cover and charged. Two RUR platoons were overrun. Acting battalion commander Major Tony Blake orchestrated the firepower of tanks, artillery and US jets in an immediate riposte. Second lieutenant Mervyn McCord was part of a patrol that counter-attacked their previous position following a napalm strike. The men took the ridge without casualties and stood around congratulating themselves until a major arrived, roaring: "This is not a funfair!" Meanwhile, 'B' Company prepared to retake the other lost peak. "We lined them up," said Captain Robin Charley, a Belfast man who had volunteered for Korea. "That attack went in exactly by the book — just like at the School of Infantry!" The Ulstermen were ecstatic at having beaten off the PVA. To their right, the Royal Northumberland Fusiliers had also fought a bloody, but successful battle. Elsewhere, though, the front had buckled. UN forces were falling back. Seoul was to be abandoned. The RUR would be the last UN unit to withdraw, the US division on its left flank had already departed.

== Memorial ==
A memorial was subsequently erected on the battlefield to the memory of those who fell at Chaegunghyon. It was later transported back to Ireland in H.M.S. Belfast and re-erected at the RUR barracks in Ballymena, Co. Antrim. These barracks were closed in March 2008 and, following a request from the British Korean Veterans' Association, Belfast City Council gave permission for the memorial to be relocated to the grounds of the City Hall, near the cenotaph.
