= Korean War Memorial, London =

War memorial in London

Coordinates: 51°30′13″N 0°7′26″W

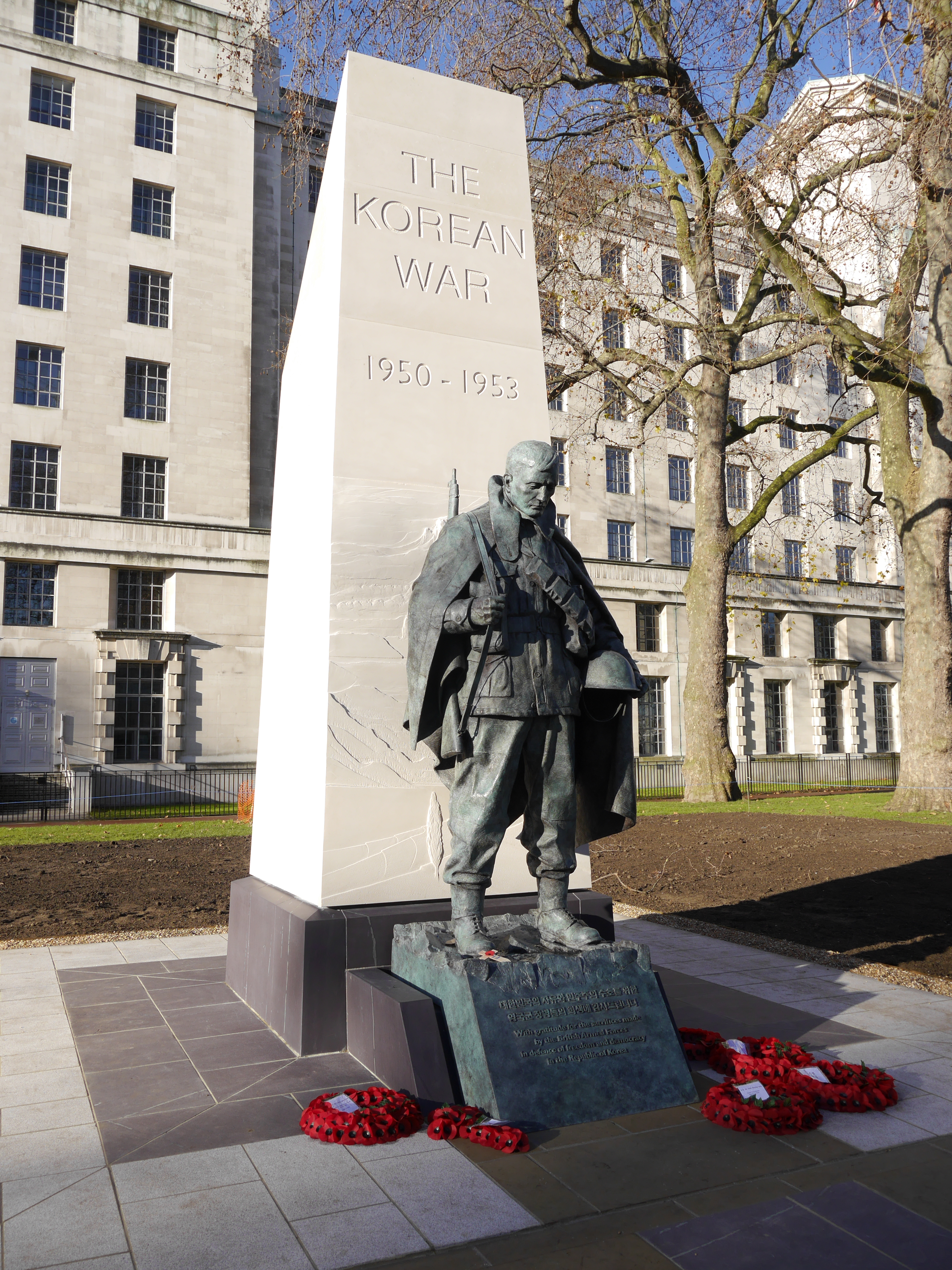
The memorial two weeks after its unveiling

A memorial to the British soldiers in the Korean War was unveiled in Victoria Embankment Gardens, between the River Thames and the Ministry of Defence headquarters in London, England, on 3 December 2014. The memorial, a bronze statue of a British soldier by the sculptor Philip Jackson, with a Portland stone obelisk on a Welsh slate base, was a gift from the Government of South Korea and was unveiled in a ceremony led by Prince Richard, Duke of Gloucester.

== See also ==
- Gloucester Valley Battle Monument, a memorial site for British troops in South Korea
- United Nations Memorial Cemetery, South Korea, where most of the British soldiers killed in the war are buried
