= Imjin River =

River in North and South Korea

Coordinates: 37°47′N 126°40′E

Imjin
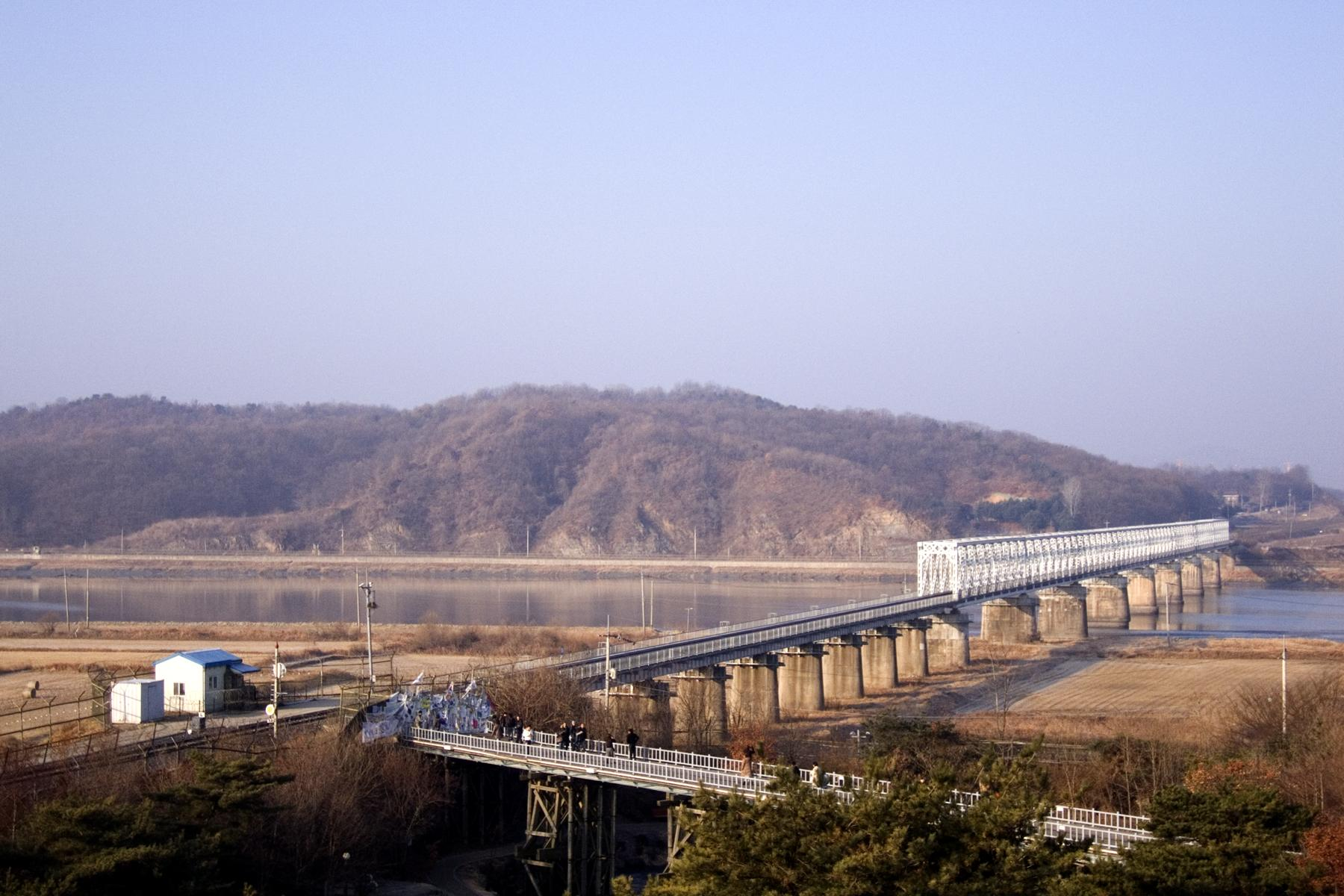
- Bridge of Freedom crossing the Imjin. Located in Munsan, Paju, South Korea.
- Native name: 임진강/림진강 (Korean)

Location
- Country: North Korea (PRK), South Korea (ROK)
- Provinces: Kangwon (PRK), North Hwanghae (PRK), Gyeonggi (ROK)

Physical characteristics
- Source: Turyu Mountain
  - location: Poptong, Kangwon Province, North Korea
- Mouth: Han River
  - location: Paju, Gyeonggi Province, South Korea
- Length: 273.50 km (169.95 mi)
- Basin size: 8,138.90 km^{2} (3,142.45 sq mi)

- South Korean name
- Hangul: 임진강
- Hanja: 臨津江
- RR: Imjingang
- MR: Imjin'gang

North Korean name
- Hangul: 림진강
- Hanja: 臨津江
- RR: Rimjingang
- MR: Rimjin'gang

The Imjin River (Korean: 임진강; South Korean spelling) or Rimjin (림진강; North Korean spelling) is a river in Korea. It flows from north to south, crossing the Demilitarized Zone and joining the Han River downstream of Seoul, near the Yellow Sea.

The river is not the namesake of the Imjin War (Japanese invasions in the late 16th century).

== History ==
Imjin River was the site of two major battles: the Battle of Imjin River during the Imjin war in 1592, and the Battle of the Imjin River that took place during the Korean War.

=== Joint Use Zone ===
On November 4, 2018, a 20-member team consisting of 10 people from North Korea and 10 people from South Korea began a joint inter-Korean survey intended to lead to the development a Joint Utilization Zone along Imjin River's estuary. The Zone would allow civilians to access the estuary for tourism, ecological protection and the collection of construction aggregate under the protection of militaries from both sides of the Korean border. On November 5, 2018, the councils of South Korea's Gangwon and Gyeonggi provinces, which border the DMZ, signed a “peace working agreement” at Dorasan Station in Paju, giving local approval to the Joint Utilization Zone. The inter-Korean survey of Imjin River's estuary was completed on December 9, 2018. The new map of the river's estuary, which consists of newly discovered reefs, was to be made public by January 25, 2019.

== Characteristics ==
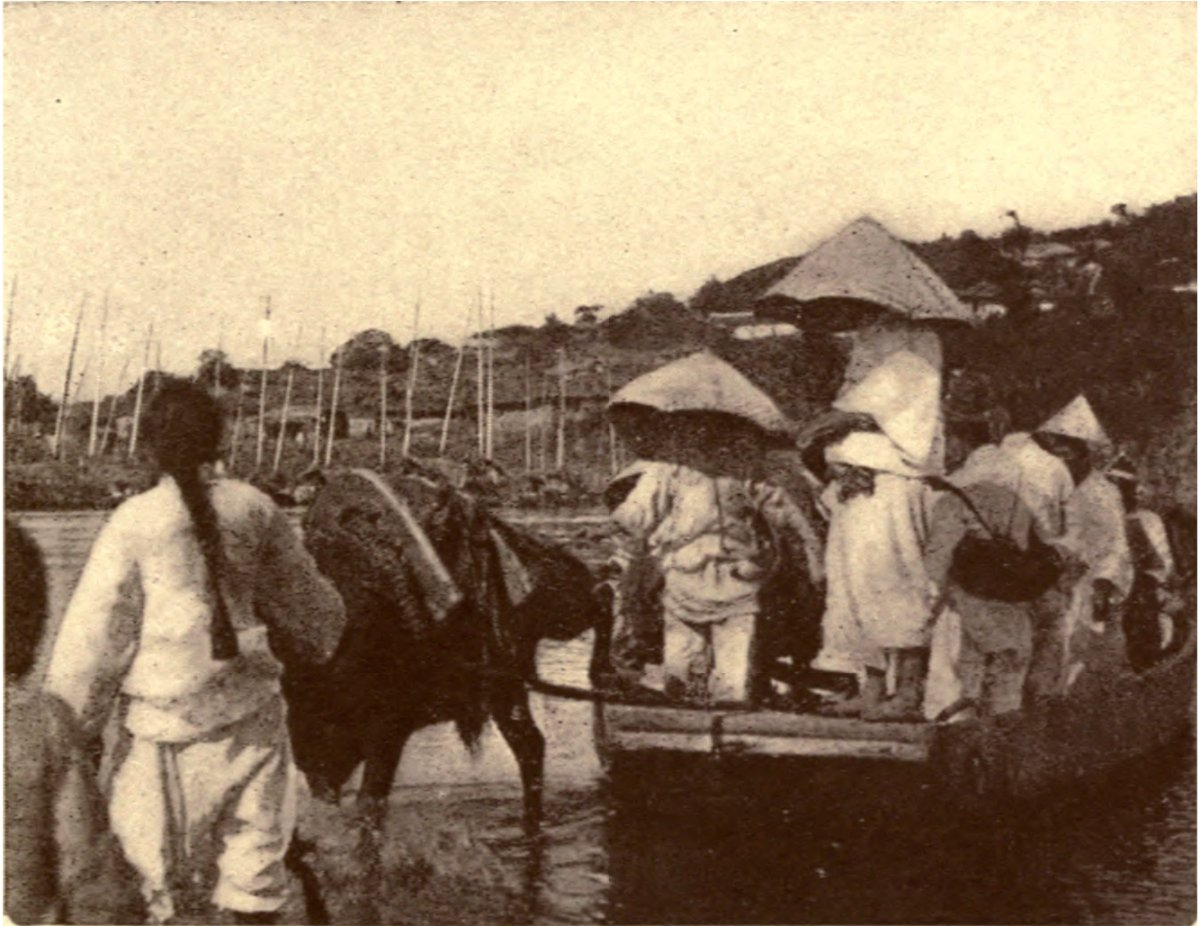
Ferry across Imjin River in 1889

The active channel of Imjin River uses only about 150 to 200 feet of the 1,200-foot (370 m) width of the dry riverbed that it runs through, which is bordered by almost vertical rock cliffs standing approximately 75 feet (23 m) above the mean low water level. It gives no indication in normal times of the tremendous power it develops when in flood. During the Korean rainy season of July and August, the Imjin becomes a raging torrent, largely confined by its steep rocky banks. Fed by its larger tributaries and many small mountain streams, it reaches flood heights of 48 feet (15 m) above mean water level and a velocity of 15 to 20 feet per second (6 m/s). The rapid runoff of approximately 95 percent of precipitation during heavy general rains has caused Imjin, on occasion, to rise at a rate of more than six feet per hour.

During the severe Korean winter, icy winds sweep down the Imjin; the sub-zero temperatures cause thick ice to form on the river. Fluctuations in the level of the river, particularly tidal action in the lower reaches, break up this ice, and large amounts of floe ice pile up against any obstacle in the channel.

Many in South Korea nickname Imjin as the "River of the Dead" as in the past, large numbers of dead bodies have floated down the river from the North. The most recent occurrence was during the major famine of the 1990s when millions of North Koreans are believed to have starved to death.

== In popular culture ==
In the popular novel MASH: A Novel About Three Army Doctors, the American 4077th Mobile Army Surgical Hospital ("MASH") unit is located close to a branch of the Imjin River.

Imjin River is the subject of a famous North Korean popular song, "Rimjingang", named after the river. It was composed in 1957 with lyrics written by North Korean poet Pak Se-yong. It is a well-known song in North Korea, as it refers to Imjin River as a symbol of freedom flowing from north to south. This song depicts the sadness of a divided homeland and alludes to the infamous history of the river. The song (as "Imujingawa") later became popular in Japan when it was covered by The Folk Crusaders and other artists. It remains popular among Korean communities worldwide, as a song of hope that the Korean people will once again be united and free.

== See also ==
- Hantan River
- Han River
- List of rivers of Korea
- Hwanggang Dam
