= United Nations Forces in the Korean War =

After the outbreak of Korean War on 25 June 1950, sixteen countries provided combat troops for South Korea, forming the United Nations Forces. In order of arrival/deployment, these were the United States, United Kingdom, Australia, Netherlands, Canada, France, New Zealand, Philippines, Turkey, Thailand, South Africa, Greece, Belgium, Luxembourg, Ethiopia and Colombia.

The source of the statistics in this article is the official book about Korean War statistics published by the South Korean Ministry of National Defense Institute for Military History in June 2014.

Statistics in this article may differ from the statistics of each country.

== United States ==
- Units:
  - U.S. Army:
  - U.S. Navy:
  - U.S. Air Force:
  - U.S. Marine Corps: 1st Marine Division and so on.
- Deployment: 27 June 1950 (Air Force, Navy), 1 July 1950 (Army)
- First Battle: 5 July 1950
- Withdrawal: October 1954 (main force)
- Participants: Total about 1,789,000
- Casualties
  - As of 2023, MIAs and Unaccounted Remains: 7,428
  - As of 2022, according to the list of Wall of Remembrance in the Korean War Veterans Memorial, killed soldiers were 36,634. But this figure fluctuates depending on the ongoing correction of list.
  - As of 2021, United States Department of Veterans Affairs
    - Killed: 36,574 (Battle Deaths: 33,739, Other Deaths: 2,835)
    - Wounded: 103,284
  - As of 2014

| Deaths and Woundings | Army | Air Force | Navy | Marine Corps | Total |
|---|---|---|---|---|---|
| Total Killed (a+b+c+d+e) | 27,728 | 1,198 | 492 | 4,268 | 36,516 |
| Killed in action (a) | 19,754 | 198 | 364 | 3,321 | 23,637 |
| Killed in Wounding (b) | 1,904 | 16 | 28 | 536 | 2,484 |
| Killed in Missing (c) | 3,317 | 960 | 97 | 385 | 4,759 |
| Killed in POW Camps (d) | 2,753 | 24 | 3 | 26 | 2,806 |
| Other Deaths (e) (Non-battle Deaths) | ... | ... | ... | ... | 2,830 |
| Wounded | ... | ... | ... | ... | 92,134 (Note: Counted as the 1 person – wounded soldiers with over 2 woundings); 103,284 (Note: Counted as the each person – wounded soldiers with over 2 woundings) |

| POWs and MIAs | Army | Air Force | Navy | Marine Corps | Total |
|---|---|---|---|---|---|
| Total POWs and MIAs (a+b+c+d) | | | | | 8,123 |
| Total captured POWs (a+b+c) | 5,356 | 926 | 286 | 677 | 7,245 |
| Killed in POW Camps (a) | 2,753 | 24 | 3 | 26 | 2,806 |
| Living POWs (Returned) (b) | | | | | 4,418 |
| Living POWs (Defectors) (c) | | | | | 21 |
| Unaccounted (d) | ... | ... | ... | ... | 931 |

=== Mexicans and Puerto Ricans ===
Many Mexicans and Puerto Ricans served in the United States Army during the Korean War.

== United Kingdom ==
- Units:
  - British Army: 1st Commonwealth Division, 27th Infantry Brigade, 28th Commonwealth Infantry Brigade, 29th Infantry Brigade and so on.
  - Royal Navy: 1st Aircraft Carrier Squadron
  - Royal Marines: 41 Independent Commando
- Deployment: 1 July 1950 (Navy), 28 August 1950 (Army)
- First Battle: 4 September 1950
- Withdrawal: March 1955 (Navy), 1954–1957 (Army)
- Participants: Total about 56,000
- Casualties

| Killed | Wounded | MIA | POW | Total |
|---|---|---|---|---|
| 1,078 | 2,674 | 179 | 978 | 4,909 |

== Australia ==
- Units:
  - Australian Army: Royal Australian Regiment and so on.
  - Australian Navy: Aircraft carrier (1), Destroyer (2), Frigate (1)
  - Australian Air Force: No. 91 (Composite) Wing RAAF
- Deployment: 1 July 1950 (Air Force, Navy), 27 September 1950 (Army)
- First Battle: 5 October 1950
- Withdrawal: November 1953 (Air Force),1955 (Navy), 24 March 1956 (Army)
- Participants: Total 17,164
- Casualties

| Killed | Wounded | MIA | POW | Total |
|---|---|---|---|---|
| 340 | 1,216 | N/A | 28 | 1,584 |

== Netherlands ==
- Units:
  - Royal Netherlands Army: Regiment van Heutsz
  - Royal Netherlands Navy: Destroyer (1)
- Deployment: 19 July 1950 (Navy), 23 November 1950 (Army)
- First Battle: 11 December 1950
- Withdrawal: 9 October, 9 November, 6 December 1954 (Army), 24 January 1955 (Navy)
- Participants: Total 5,322
- Casualties

| Killed | Wounded | MIA | POW | Total |
|---|---|---|---|---|
| 120 | 645 | N/A | 3 | 768 |

== Canada ==
- Units:
  - Canadian Army: Royal Canadian Regiment and so on.
  - Royal Canadian Navy: Destroyer (3)
  - Royal Canadian Air Force: 426 Transport Training Squadron
- Deployment: 28 July 1950 (Air Force), 30 July 1950 (Navy), 18 December 1950 (Army)
- First Battle: 15 February 1951
- Withdrawal: July 1953 (Air Force), September 1955 (Navy), June 1957 (Army)
- Participants: Total 26,791
- Casualties

| Killed | Wounded | MIA | POW | Total |
|---|---|---|---|---|
| 516 | 1,212 | 1 | 32 | 1,761 |

== France ==
- Units:
  - French Army: French Battalion
  - French Navy: French aviso La Grandière
- Deployment: 29 July 1950 (Navy), 29 November 1950 (Army)
- First Battle: 13 December 1950
- Withdrawal: December 1950 (Navy), 22 October 1953 (Army)
- Participants: Total 3,421
- Casualties

| Killed | Wounded | MIA | POW | Total |
|---|---|---|---|---|
| 262 | 1,008 | 7 | 12 | 1,289 |

== New Zealand ==
- Units:
  - New Zealand Army: Royal Regiment of New Zealand Artillery
  - Royal New Zealand Navy: Frigate (6)
- Deployment: 30 July 1950 (Navy), 31 December 1950 (Army)
- First Battle: 28 January 1951
- Withdrawal: 2 March 1954 (Navy), 8 November 1954 (Army)
- Participants: Total 3,794
- Casualties

| Killed | Wounded | MIA | POW | Total |
|---|---|---|---|---|
| 23 | 79 | 1 | N/A | 103 |

== Philippines ==
- Units:
  - Philippine Army: Philippine Expeditionary Forces to Korea
- Deployment: 19 September 1950
- First Battle: 1 October 1950
- Withdrawal: 13 May 1955
- Participants: Total 5,000 - 7,420
- Casualties

| Killed | Wounded | MIA | POW | Total |
|---|---|---|---|---|
| 92-112 | 299-356 | 16 | 41 | 483 |

== Turkey ==
- Units:
  - Turkish Army: Turkish Brigade
- Deployment: 17 October 1950
- First Battle: 12 November 1950
- Withdrawal: Summer 1954 (main force), 27 June 1971
- Participants: Total 21,212
- Casualties

| Killed | Wounded | MIA | POW | Total |
|---|---|---|---|---|
| 721 | 2,111 | 168 | 244 | 3,244 |

== Thailand ==
- Units:
  - Royal Thai Army: 21st Infantry Regiment, Queen Sirikit's Guard
  - Royal Thai Navy: Frigate (7), Troopship (1)
  - Royal Thai Air Force: Transport Aircraft Squadron
- Deployment: 7 November 1950 (Army, Navy), 18 June 1951 (Air Force)
- First Battle: 22 November 1950
- Withdrawal: 1954 (Army) – main force, January 1955 (Navy), 6 November 1964 (Air Force), 23 June 1972 (Army)
- Participants: Total 6,326
- Casualties

| Killed | Wounded | MIA | POW | Total |
|---|---|---|---|---|
| 129 | 1,139 | 5 | N/A | 1,273 |

== South Africa ==
- Units:
  - South African Air Force: 2 Squadron SAAF
- Deployment: 12 November 1950
- First Battle: 19 November 1950
- Withdrawal: 29 October 1953
- Participants: Total 826
- Casualties

| Killed | Wounded | MIA | POW | Total |
|---|---|---|---|---|
| 36 | N/A | N/A | 8 | 44 |

== Greece ==
- Units:
  - Hellenic Army: Greek Expeditionary Force
  - Hellenic Air Force: 13th Flight – CTransport Aircraft C-47 (7)
- Deployment: 1 December 1950 (Air Force), 9 December 1950 (Army)
- First Battle: 5 January 1951
- Withdrawal: April 1955 (Air Force), 22 January 1956 (Army) – main force, December 1955 (Army)
- Participants: Total 4,992
- Casualties

| Killed | Wounded | MIA | POW | Total |
|---|---|---|---|---|
| 192 | 543 | N/A | 3 | 738 |

== Belgium ==
- Units:
  - Belgian Army: Belgium-Luxembourg Battalion
- Deployment: 31 January 1951
- First Battle: 6 March 1951
- Withdrawal: 15 June 1955
- Participants: Total 3,498
- Casualties

| Killed | Wounded | MIA | POW | Total |
|---|---|---|---|---|
| 99 | 336 | 4 | 1 | 440 |

== Luxembourg ==
- Units:
  - Luxembourg Army: Belgium-Luxembourg Battalion
- Deployment: 31 January 1951
- First Battle: 13 March 1951
- Withdrawal: 7 January 1953
- Participants: Total 100
- Casualties

| Killed | Wounded | MIA | POW | Total |
|---|---|---|---|---|
| 2 | 13 | N/A | N/A | 15 |

== Ethiopia ==
- Units:
  - Ethiopian Ground Forces: Kagnew Battalion
- Deployment: 6 May 1951
- First Battle: 11 July 1951
- Withdrawal: 3 March 1965
- Participants: Total 3,518
- Casualties

| Killed | Wounded | MIA | POW | Total |
|---|---|---|---|---|
| 122 | 536 | N/A | N/A | 658 |

== Colombia ==
- Units:
  - Colombian Army: Colombian Battalion
  - Colombian Navy: Frigate (3)
- Deployment: 8 May 1951 (Navy), 15 June 1951 (Army)
- First Battle: 1 August 1951
- Withdrawal: 29 October 1954 (Army), 11 October 1955 (Navy)
- Participants: Total 5,100
- Casualties

| Killed | Wounded | MIA | POW | Total |
|---|---|---|---|---|
| 213 | 448 | N/A | 28 | 689 |

== Memorial Day ==
- 11 November: UN Veterans International Memorial Day (Turn Toward Busan) / 유엔참전용사 국제추모의 날

== See also ==
- United Nations Command
- United Nations Security Council Resolution 84
- Chapter VII of the UN Charter
- Korean War
- Bombing of North Korea
- Far East Command (United States)
- United Nations Memorial Cemetery in Busan, where 2,300 casualties from various nations are buried
- United Nations and North Korea
- United Nations and South Korea
- Medical support in the Korean War
