= United Nations Command =

- 유엔군사령부
- Active: 24 July 1950 – present (76 years, 3 months)
- Engagements: Korean War (1950–1953)
- Website: www.unc.mil

Commanders
- Commander: Gen. Xavier Brunson (US Army)
- Deputy Commander: Major General Scott Winter (Australian Army)
- Notable commanders: GA Douglas MacArthur (US Army); Gen. Matthew Ridgway (US Army)

Insignia
- Flag

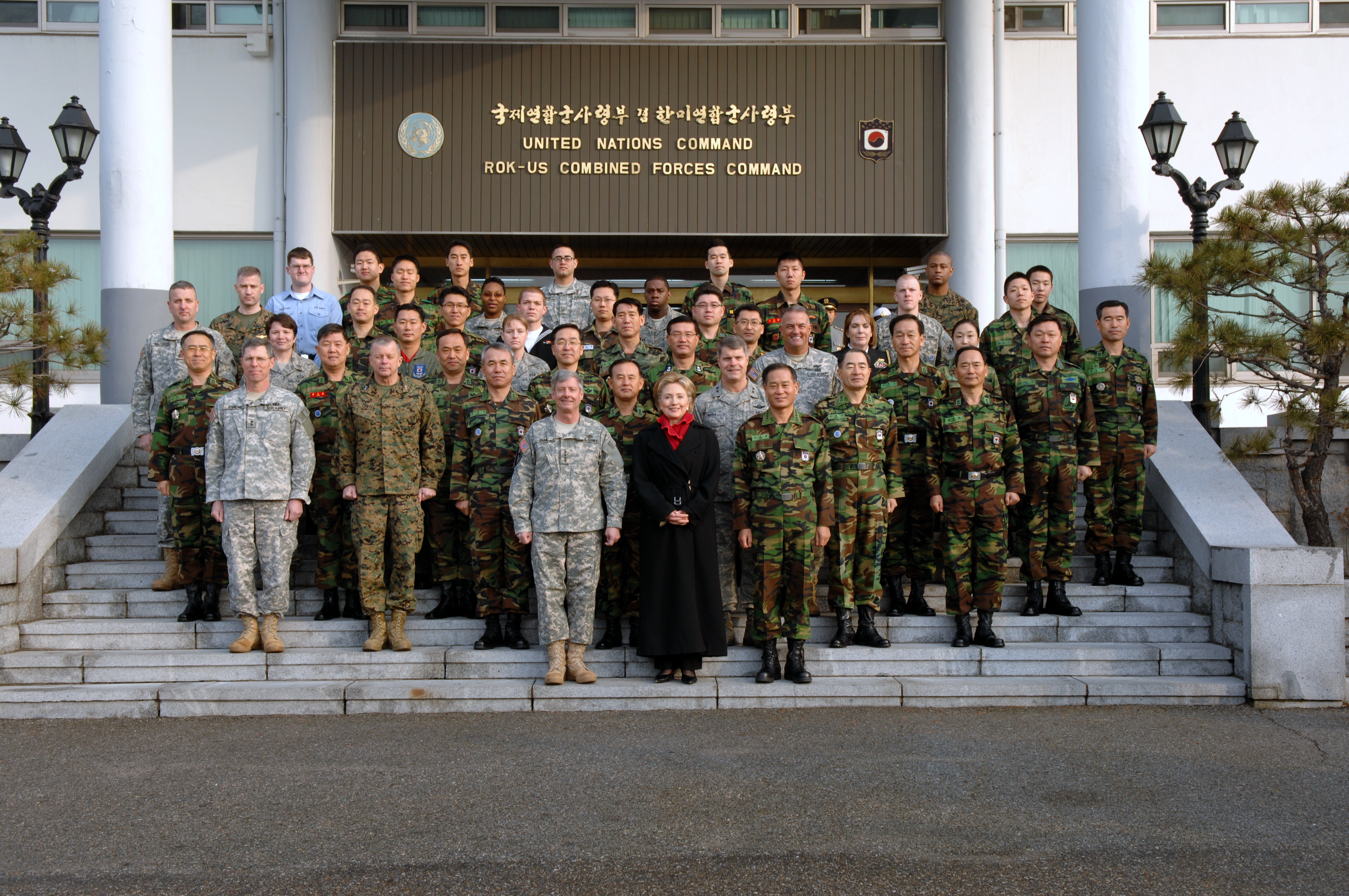
Headquarters of the United Nations Command and ROK-US Combined Forces Command in 2009.

United Nations Command (UNC or UN Command) is the multinational military force established under UN authority to support the Republic of Korea (South Korea) during and after the Korean War. It was the first international unified command established by the UN Security Council and the first attempt at collective security under the UN System after the UN Charter was signed. It was the first time that the Security Council authorized the use of force under Chapter VII of the Charter. UN Security Council Resolutions 83 and 84 provided the international legal authority for Member States to use military force to "restore peace on the Korean Peninsula" and designated the United States as the leader of the UN forces, with General Douglas MacArthur appointed Supreme Commander of the UNC.

The UNC was established on 7 July 1950 following the UN Security Council's recognition, on 25 June, of North Korean aggression against South Korea. The motion passed because the Soviet Union, a close ally of North Korea and a member of the UN Security Council, was boycotting the UN at the time over its recognition of the Republic of China (Taiwan) rather than the People's Republic of China as 'China'. UN member states were called to provide assistance in repelling the North's invasion, with the UNC providing a cohesive command structure under which the disparate forces would operate. During the course of the Korean War, 22 nations contributed military or medical personnel to UN Command; although the United States led the UNC and provided the bulk of its troops and funding, all participants formally fought under the auspices of the UN, with the operation classified as a "UN-led police action".

On 27 July 1953, United Nations Command, the Korean People's Army, and the Chinese People's Volunteers signed the Korean Armistice Agreement, ending open hostilities. The agreement established the Military Armistice Commission (MAC), consisting of representatives of the signatories, to supervise the implementation of the armistice terms, and the Neutral Nations Supervisory Commission (NNSC), composed of nations that did not participate in the conflict, to monitor the armistice's restrictions on the parties' reinforcing or rearming themselves. (Note: The North Korean-Chinese MAC was replaced by the "Panmunjom Mission" under exclusive North Korean administration.) In 1975, the UN General Assembly adopted resolution 3390 (XXX), which called upon the parties to the Armistice Agreement to replace it with a peace agreement, and expressed the hope that UNC would be dissolved on 1 January 1976; however, as of 2025, the UNC continues to maintain and enforce the Armistice Agreement.

Since 1953, UN Command's primary duties have been to maintain the armistice and facilitate diplomacy between North and South Korea. Although "MAC" meetings have not occurred since 1994, UN Command representatives routinely engage members of the Korean People's Army in formal and informal meetings. The most recent formal negotiations on the terms of Armistice occurred between October and November 2018. Duty officers from both sides of the Joint Security Area (commonly known as the Truce Village of Panmunjom) conduct daily communications checks and have the ability to engage face-to-face when the situation demands.

== Origin and legal status ==
United Nations Command operates under the mandates of United Nations Security Council (UNSC) Resolutions 82, 83, 84, and 85. These passed while the Soviet Union was boycotting the United Nations for awarding China's seat in the Security Council to the Republic of China. While the UN had some military authority through Chapter VII of the UN Charter, early Cold War tensions meant that the forces envisaged in those articles had yet to become reality. Thus, the UN had little practical ability to raise a military force in response to the North Korean invasion of the South. Consequently, the UNSC designated the United States as the executive agent for leading a "unified command" under the UN flag. As it was a designated body, the UN exercised little control over the combat forces. This represented the first attempt at collective security under the UN System.

When the warring parties signed the Korean Armistice Agreement on 27 July 1953, the commander delivered the Agreement to the UN. In August 1953, the United Nations General Assembly passed a resolution “noting with approval” the Armistice Agreement, a step that was critical for the UN to take the next step of organizing the 1954 Geneva Conference meant to negotiate a diplomatic peace between North and South Korea. The adoption of the Korean Armistice Agreement in the UN General Assembly underwrites UN Command's current role of maintaining and enforcing the Armistice Agreement.

The role of the United States as the executive agent for the unified command has led to questions over its continued validity. Most notably, in 1994, UN Secretary General Boutros Boutros-Ghali wrote in a letter to the North Korean Foreign Minister that:

The Security Council did not establish the unified command as a subsidiary organ under its control, but merely recommended the creation of such a command, specifying that it be under the authority of the United States. Therefore, the dissolution of the unified command does not fall within the responsibility of any United Nations organ but is a matter within the competence of the Government of the United States.

The UN's official position is that the Korean War-era Security Council and General Assembly resolutions remain in force. This was evidenced in 2013 when North Korea announced unilateral abrogation of the Armistice Agreement: UN spokesman Martin Nesirky asserted that since the Armistice Agreement had been adopted by the General Assembly, no single party could dissolve it unilaterally. The UNC continues to serve as the signatory and party of the Armistice opposite the Korean People's Army.

In JENNINGS v. MARKLEY, WARDEN, a determination was made by the Court of Appeals Seventh Circuit that American soldiers of the UNC were still liable to the Uniform Code of Military Justice although they fought under the UN blue flag.

== Establishment in 1950 ==
After troops of North Korea invaded South Korea on 25 June 1950, the United Nations Security Council adopted Resolution 82 calling on North Korea to cease hostilities and withdraw to the 38th parallel.

Two days later, the UNSC adopted Resolution 83, recommending that members of the United Nations provide assistance to the Republic of Korea "to repel the armed attack and to restore international peace and security to the area".

The first non-Korean and non-U.S. unit to see combat was the No. 77 Squadron of the Royal Australian Air Force, which began escort, patrol and ground attack sorties from Iwakuni Royal Australian Air Base, Japan on 2 July 1950. On 29 June 1950, New Zealand made preparations to dispatch two Loch class frigates, Tutira and Pukaki, to Korean waters; on 3 July, the ships left Devonport Naval Base, Auckland and joined other Commonwealth forces at Sasebo, Japan on 2 August. For the duration of the war, at least two NZ vessels would be on station in the theater.

Resolution 84, adopted on 7 July 1950, recommended that members providing military forces and other assistance to South Korea "make such forces and other assistance available to a unified command under the United States of America".

President Syngman Rhee of the Republic of Korea assigned operational command of ROK ground, sea, and air forces to General MacArthur as Commander-in-Chief UN Command (CINCUNC) on 15 July 1950:

In view of the common military effort of the United Nations on behalf of the Republic of Korea, in which all military forces, land, sea and air, of all the United Nations fighting in or near Korea have been placed under your operational command, and in which you have been designated Supreme Commander United Nations Forces, I am happy to assign to you command authority over all land, sea, and air forces of the Republic of Korea during the period of the continuation of the present state of hostilities, such command to be exercised either by you personally or by such military commander or commanders to whom you may delegate the exercise of this authority within Korea or in adjacent seas.

On 29 August 1950, the British Commonwealth's 27th Infantry Brigade arrived at Busan to join UNC ground forces, which until then included only ROK and U.S. forces. The 27th Brigade moved into the Naktong River line west of Daegu.

Units from other countries of the UN followed: the Belgian United Nations Command, the 25th Canadian Infantry Brigade, the Colombian Battalion, the Ethiopian Kagnew Battalion, the French Battalion, the Greek 15th Infantry Regiment, New Zealand's 16th Field Regiment, Royal New Zealand Artillery, the Philippine Expeditionary Forces to Korea, the South African No. 2 Squadron SAAF, the Turkish Brigade, and forces from Luxembourg and the Netherlands. Additionally, Denmark, India, Iran, Norway and Sweden provided medical units; Italy provided a hospital, even though it was not a UN member at the time.

By 1 September 1950, less than two months before the formation of United Nations Command, these combined forces numbered 180,000, of which 92,000 were South Koreans, with most of the remainder being Americans, followed by the 1,600-man British 27th Infantry Brigade.

Rockoff writes that "President Truman responded quickly to the June invasion by authorizing the use of U.S. troops and ordering air strikes and a naval blockade. He did not, however, seek a declaration of war, or call for full mobilization, in part because such actions might have been misinterpreted by Russia and China. Instead, on 19 July he called for partial mobilization and asked Congress for an appropriation of $10 billion for the war." Cohen writes that: "All of Truman's advisers saw the events in Korea as a test of American will to resist Soviet attempts to expand their power, and their system. The United States ordered warships to the Taiwan Strait to prevent Mao's forces from invading Taiwan and mopping up the remnants of Chiang Kai-shek's army there."

As of 1 July 1957 the commander of the United Nations Command was "triple hatted" being given command the United States Forces Korea and Eighth United States Army in addition to the UN command. The first commander to be "triple hatted" in this way was General George Decker, who would later serve as the Chief of Staff of the United States Army.

== Commander ==
No.	Commander		Term			Service branch
No.	Portrait	Name	Took office	Left office	Term length	Service branch
1	Douglas MacArthur	General of the Army; Douglas MacArthur (1880–1964)	7 July 1950	11 April 1951	278 days	U.S. Army
2	Matthew Ridgway	General; Matthew Ridgway (1895–1993)	11 April 1951	12 May 1952	1 year, 31 days	U.S. Army
3	Mark W. Clark	General; Mark W. Clark (1896–1984)	12 May 1952	7 October 1953	1 year, 148 days	U.S. Army
4	John E. Hull	General; John E. Hull (1895–1975)	7 October 1953	1 April 1955	1 year, 176 days	U.S. Army
5	Maxwell D. Taylor	General; Maxwell D. Taylor (1901–1987)	1 April 1955	5 June 1955	65 days	U.S. Army
6	Lyman Lemnitzer	General; Lyman Lemnitzer (1899–1988)	5 June 1955	1 July 1957	2 years, 26 days	U.S. Army
7	George Decker	General; George Decker (1902–1980)	1 July 1957	30 June 1959	1 year, 364 days	U.S. Army
8	Carter B. Magruder	General; Carter B. Magruder (1900–1988)	1 July 1959	30 June 1961	1 year, 364 days	U.S. Army
9	Guy S. Meloy	General; Guy S. Meloy (1903–1968)	1 July 1961	31 July 1963	2 years, 30 days	U.S. Army
10	Hamilton H. Howze	General; Hamilton H. Howze (1908–1998)	1 August 1963	15 June 1965	1 year, 318 days	U.S. Army
11	Dwight E. Beach	General; Dwight E. Beach (1908–2000)	16 June 1965	31 August 1966	1 year, 76 days	U.S. Army
12	Charles H. Bonesteel III	General; Charles H. Bonesteel III (1909–1977)	1 September 1966	30 September 1969	3 years, 29 days	U.S. Army
13	John H. Michaelis	General; John H. Michaelis (1912–1985)	1 October 1969	31 August 1972	2 years, 335 days	U.S. Army
14	Donald V. Bennett	General; Donald V. Bennett (1915–2005)	1 September 1972	31 July 1973	333 days	U.S. Army
15	Richard G. Stilwell	General; Richard G. Stilwell (1917–1991)	1 August 1973	8 October 1976	3 years, 68 days	U.S. Army
16	John W. Vessey Jr.	General; John W. Vessey Jr. (1922–2016)	8 October 1976	10 July 1979	2 years, 275 days	U.S. Army
17	John A. Wickham Jr.	General; John A. Wickham Jr. (1928–2024)	10 July 1979	4 June 1982	2 years, 329 days	U.S. Army
18	Robert W. Sennewald	General; Robert W. Sennewald (1929–2023)	4 June 1982	1 June 1984	1 year, 363 days	U.S. Army
19	William J. Livsey	General; William J. Livsey (1931–2016)	1 June 1984	25 June 1987	3 years, 24 days	U.S. Army
20	Louis C. Menetrey Jr.	General; Louis C. Menetrey Jr. (1929–2009)	25 June 1987	26 June 1990	3 years, 1 day	U.S. Army
21	Robert W. RisCassi	General; Robert W. RisCassi (born 1936)	26 June 1990	15 June 1993	2 years, 354 days	U.S. Army
22	Gary E. Luck	General; Gary E. Luck (1937–2024)	15 June 1993	9 July 1996	3 years, 24 days	U.S. Army
23	John H. Tilelli Jr.	General; John H. Tilelli Jr. (born 1941)	9 July 1996	9 December 1999	3 years, 153 days	U.S. Army
24	Thomas A. Schwartz	General; Thomas A. Schwartz (born 1945)	9 December 1999	1 May 2002	2 years, 143 days	U.S. Army
25	Leon J. LaPorte	General; Leon J. LaPorte (born 1946)	1 May 2002	3 February 2006	3 years, 278 days	U.S. Army
26	B.B. Bell	General; B.B. Bell (born 1947)	3 February 2006	3 June 2008	2 years, 121 days	U.S. Army
27	Walter L. Sharp	General; Walter L. Sharp (born 1952)	3 June 2008	14 July 2011	3 years, 41 days	U.S. Army
28	James D. Thurman	General; James D. Thurman (born 1953)	14 July 2011	12 October 2013	2 years, 80 days	U.S. Army
29	Curtis M. Scaparrotti	General; Curtis M. Scaparrotti (born 1956)	2 October 2013	30 April 2016	2 years, 211 days	U.S. Army
30	Vincent K. Brooks	General; Vincent K. Brooks (born 1958)	30 April 2016	8 November 2018	2 years, 192 days	U.S. Army
31	Robert B. Abrams	General; Robert B. Abrams (born 1960)	8 November 2018	2 July 2021	2 years, 236 days	U.S. Army
32	Paul LaCamera	General; Paul LaCamera (born 1963)	2 July 2021	20 December 2024	3 years, 171 days	U.S. Army
33	Xavier Brunson	General; Xavier Brunson (born c. 1965)	20 December 2024	Incumbent	1 year, 321 days	U.S. Army

== Deputy Commander ==
No.	Deputy Commander		Term			Service branch
No.	Portrait	Name	Took office	Left office	Term length	Service branch
1	John B. Coulter	Lieutenant General; John B. Coulter (1891–1983)	7 July 1950	1952	–	U.S. Army
2	William Kelly Harrison Jr.	Lieutenant General; William Kelly Harrison Jr. (1895–1987)	1952	1954	–	U.S. Army
3	Bruce C. Clarke	Lieutenant General; Bruce C. Clarke (1901–1988)	1954	1954	–	U.S. Army
4	Claude Birkett Ferenbaugh	Lieutenant General; Claude Birkett Ferenbaugh (1899–1975)	10 December 1954	27 June 1955	–	U.S. Army
5	John Howell Collier	Lieutenant General; John Howell Collier (1898–1980)	27 June 1955	September 1955	–	U.S. Army
6	Charles D. Palmer	Lieutenant General; Charles D. Palmer (1902–1999)	September 1955	1958	–	U.S. Army
7	Emerson LeRoy Cummings	Lieutenant General; Emerson LeRoy Cummings (1902–1986)	December 1958	January 1961	–	U.S. Army
8	Andrew T. McNamara	Lieutenant General; Andrew T. McNamara (1905–2002)	January 1961	1 October 1961	–	U.S. Army
9	Samuel L. Myers	Lieutenant General; Samuel L. Myers (1905–1987)	1 October 1961	31 March 1963	–	U.S. Army
10	Charles W. G. Rich	Lieutenant General; Charles W. G. Rich (1909–1993)	1964	1966	–	U.S. Army
11	Vernon P. Mock	Lieutenant General; Vernon P. Mock (1912–1983)	1966	February 1969	–	U.S. Army
12	John H. Michaelis	Lieutenant General; John H. Michaelis (1912–1985)	February 1969	1 October 1969	–	U.S. Army
13	John A. Heintges	Lieutenant General; John A. Heintges (1912–1994)	1969	22 May 1970	–	U.S. Army
14	Patrick F. Cassidy	Lieutenant General; Patrick F. Cassidy (1915–1990)	June 1970	14 September 1971	–	U.S. Army
15	William R. Peers	Lieutenant General; William R. Peers (1914–1984)	14 September 1971	1973	–	U.S. Army
16	Richard T. Knowles	Lieutenant General; Richard T. Knowles (1916–2013)	1973	July 1974	–	U.S. Army
17	Edward M. Flanagan Jr.	Lieutenant General; Edward M. Flanagan Jr. (1921–2019)	July 1974	May 1975	–	U.S. Army
18	John J. Burns	Lieutenant General; John J. Burns (1924–2000)	August 1975	June 1977	–	U.S. Air Force
19	Charles A. Gabriel	Lieutenant General; Charles A. Gabriel (1928–2003)	June 1977	1 April 1979	–	U.S. Air Force
20	Evan W. Rosencrans	Lieutenant General; Evan W. Rosencrans (1926–2007)	1 April 1979	1 May 1981	2 years, 30 days	U.S. Air Force
21	Winfield W. Scott Jr.	Lieutenant General; Winfield W. Scott Jr. (1927–2022)	1 May 1981	May 1983	–	U.S. Air Force
22	John L. Pickitt	Lieutenant General; John L. Pickitt (1933–2020)	May 1983	20 April 1985	–	U.S. Air Force
23	Jack I. Gregory	Lieutenant General; Jack I. Gregory (born 1931)	20 April 1985	9 December 1986	1 year, 233 days	U.S. Air Force
24	Craven C. Rogers Jr.	Lieutenant General; Craven C. Rogers Jr. (1934–2016)	9 December 1986	31 October 1988	1 year, 327 days	U.S. Air Force
25	Thomas A. Baker	Lieutenant General; Thomas A. Baker (born 1935)	31 October 1988	7 July 1990	1 year, 249 days	U.S. Air Force
26	Ronald Fogleman	Lieutenant General; Ronald Fogleman (born 1942)	7 July 1990	17 August 1992	2 years, 41 days	U.S. Air Force
27	Howell M. Estes III	Lieutenant General; Howell M. Estes III (born 1941)	17 August 1992	30 September 1994	2 years, 44 days	U.S. Air Force
28	Ronald W. Iverson	Lieutenant General; Ronald W. Iverson	30 September 1994	7 April 1997	2 years, 189 days	U.S. Air Force
29	Joseph E. Hurd	Lieutenant General; Joseph E. Hurd	7 April 1997	14 September 1999	2 years, 160 days	U.S. Air Force
30	Charles R. Heflebower	Lieutenant General; Charles R. Heflebower	14 September 1999	19 November 2001	2 years, 66 days	U.S. Air Force
31	Lance L. Smith	Lieutenant General; Lance L. Smith (born 1946)	19 November 2001	19 November 2003	2 years, 0 days	U.S. Air Force
32	Garry R. Trexler	Lieutenant General; Garry R. Trexler (born 1947)	19 November 2003	6 November 2006	2 years, 352 days	U.S. Air Force
33	Stephen G. Wood	Lieutenant General; Stephen G. Wood (born 1949)	6 November 2006	24 November 2008	2 years, 18 days	U.S. Air Force
34	Jeffrey A. Remington	Lieutenant General; Jeffrey A. Remington (born 1955)	24 November 2008	6 January 2012	3 years, 43 days	U.S. Air Force
35	Jan-Marc Jouas	Lieutenant General; Jan-Marc Jouas	6 January 2012	19 December 2014	2 years, 347 days	U.S. Air Force
36	Terrence J. O'Shaughnessy	Lieutenant General; Terrence J. O'Shaughnessy (born 1962)	19 December 2014	8 July 2016	1 year, 202 days	U.S. Air Force
37	Thomas W. Bergeson	Lieutenant General; Thomas W. Bergeson (born 1962)	8 July 2016	30 July 2018	2 years, 22 days	U.S. Air Force
38	Wayne Eyre	Lieutenant-general; Wayne Eyre (born 1968)	30 July 2018	26 July 2019	361 days	Canadian Army
39	Stuart Mayer	Vice admiral Stuart Mayer (born 1964)	26 July 2019	15 December 2021	2 years, 142 days	Royal Australian Navy
40	Andrew Harrison	Lieutenant General; Andrew Harrison (born 1967)	15 December 2021	14 December 2023	1 year, 364 days	British Army
41	Derek A. Macaulay	Lieutenant-general/Lieutenant-général; Derek A. Macaulay	14 December 2023	9 January 2026	2 years, 26 days	Canadian Army
39	Scott Winter	Lieutenant general Scott Winter	9 January 2026	Incumbent	301 days	Australian Army

== Current membership ==
- 18 countries, as of August 2024
- Of the original 16 countries that provided combat troops during the Korean War, currently Ethiopia and Luxembourg are not members.
  - United States
  - United Kingdom
  - Australia
  - Netherlands
  - Canada
  - France
  - New Zealand
  - Philippines
  - Turkey
  - Thailand
  - South Africa
  - Greece
  - Belgium
  - Colombia
- Of the original 6 countries that provided medical support during the Korean War, currently Sweden and India are not members.
  - Denmark
  - Norway
  - Italy
  - Germany

== Contributing forces: 1950–1953 ==
During the three years of the Korean War, the following nations were members of the UNC. By 27 July 1953, the day the Armistice Agreement was signed, UNC had reached a peak strength of 932,964:

- South Korea
- 16 countries provided combat troops:
  - United States
  - United Kingdom
  - Australia
  - Netherlands
  - Canada
  - France
  - New Zealand
  - Philippines
  - Turkey
  - Thailand
  - South Africa
  - Greece
  - Belgium
  - Luxembourg
  - Ethiopia
  - Colombia
- 6 countries provided medical support and humanitarian aid:
  - Sweden
  - India
  - Denmark
  - Norway
  - Italy
  - West Germany

During the course of the war, UNC was led by Douglas MacArthur, Matthew B. Ridgway, and Mark Wayne Clark. After the armistice was signed, John E. Hull was named UNC commander to carry out the ceasefire (including the voluntary repatriation of prisoners of war).

== Post Korean War (1953–present) ==
Following the signing of the Armistice Agreement, UNC remained in Korea to fulfill the functions of providing security and stability on the Peninsula, as well as supporting UN efforts to rebuild the war-torn Republic of Korea. Much of the fifties was marked by continuous negotiations in Military Armistice Commission meetings while the international community worked to bolster South Korea's economy and infrastructure. During this period, North Korea maintained economic and military superiority over its southern neighbor owing to Chinese and Soviet support.

The sixties proved a tenuous decade on the Korean Peninsula, punctuated by a period of hostilities between 1966 and 1969 that saw a heightened level of skirmishes in the DMZ as well as major incidents including North Korea's attempted assassination of South Korean leader Park Chung-hee and seizure of the USS Pueblo.

The seventies saw a brief period of rapprochement that later contributed to structural changes to UNC. In 1972, the North and South Korean governments signed a Joint Communique calling for more peaceful ties between the two Koreas. Concurrently, consecutive U.S. administrations (Nixon, Ford, and Carter) sought to decrease the South Korean reliance upon U.S. forces for maintaining deterrent capabilities on the Korean Peninsula. On 7 November 1978, a combined headquarters, the Republic of Korea – United States Combined Forces Command (CFC), was created, and the South Korean military units with front-line missions were transferred from the UN Command to the CFC's operational control. The commander-in-chief of the CFC, a United States military officer, answered ultimately to the national command authorities of the United States and that of South Korea.

From 1978, UNC maintained its primary functions of maintaining and enforcing the Korean Armistice Agreement, facilitating diplomacy that could support a lasting peace on the Peninsula, and providing a command that could facilitate multinational contributions should the armistice fail. UNC decreased in size, and over time, many of the billets assigned to UNC became multi-hatted with U.S. Forces Korea and Combined Forces Command.

The 1990s again saw notable change in UNC. In October 1991, UNC transferred responsibility of all DMZ sectors except for the Joint Security Area to the ROK military. In 1992, UNC appointed a South Korean General officer to serve as the Senior Member to the Military Armistice Commission. This led to the Korean People's Army and Chinese People's Volunteers boycotting MAC meetings. The collapse of the Soviet Union also led North Korea to question the alignment of their choices for the Neutral Nations Supervisory Commission. They no longer recognized Czech or Slovak representatives of Czechoslovakia when the nation split into the Czech Republic and Slovakia. In 1994, North Korea expelled the Polish delegation and also dismissed the Chinese People's Volunteers from the Panmunjom mission, owing in part to a protest over China's warming ties with South Korea.

Since 1998, UNC has seen a gradual increase of permanent international staff within the command. In between 1998 and 2003, several of the original contributors to the Korean War began deploying personnel to Korea to support UNC's armistice maintenance functions. This internationalization has continued over the next decades. In May 2018, Canadian Lt. General Wayne Eyre became the first non-American to serve as deputy commander of the UNC. Succeeding him was Australian Vice Admiral Stuart Mayer, and the Lieutenant General Andrew Harrison of the British Army, continuing the trend of non-American leadership in UNC.

=== UNC–Rear ===
United Nations Command–Rear is located at Yokota Air Base, Japan and is commanded by a Royal Australian Air Force group captain with a deputy commander from the Canadian Forces. Its task is to maintain the SOFA that permits the UNC to retain a logistics rear and staging link on Japanese soil.

== Future of the Joint Security Area ==
To further the September 2018 inter-Korean Comprehensive Military Agreement, UN Command, Republic of Korea Armed Forces, and North Korean People's Army officials met in a series of negotiations to deliberate the demilitarization of the Joint Security Area. The first two meetings in October led to Demining activities within the JSA, de-arming of personnel, and sealing off of Guard Posts. On 6 November 2018, UNC conducted a third round of negotiations with the South Korean military and North Korean People's Army on "Rules of Interaction" which would underwrite a Joint Security Area where both sides of the Military Demarcation Line — the de facto border — would be open to personnel. For undisclosed reasons, the North Korean side refused to meet to finalize these rules and the next step for realizing a demilitarized Joint Security Area. Regardless of past compromises, North Korea began to arm their soldiers in the JSA with pistols around the end of November 2023.

== See also ==
- Use of force in international law
- United Nations
- UN Security Council
- UN Security Council Resolution 83
- UN Security Council Resolution 84
- Chapter XVII of the UN Charter
- Korean War
- Bombing of North Korea
- Far East Command (United States)
- Free World Military Assistance Forces
- Medical support in the Korean War
- United Nations and North Korea
- United Nations and South Korea
- United Nations Forces in the Korean War
- United Nations Memorial Cemetery in Busan, where 2,300 casualties from various nations are buried
