= Korea and the United Nations =

Republic of Korea and Democratic People's Republic of Korea

United Nations membership
- Membership: Full member (admitted)
- Since: 17 September 1991
- UNSC seat: Non-permanent

The Republic of Korea (commonly known as South Korea) and the Democratic People's Republic of Korea (commonly known as North Korea) were simultaneously admitted to the United Nations (UN) in 1991. On 8 August 1991, the UN Security Council passed Resolution 702, recommending both states to the General Assembly for membership. On 17 September 1991, the General Assembly admitted both countries under Resolution 46/1.

== History ==
=== Observers (1948–1991) ===
In 1947, the United Nations General Assembly (UNGA) established the United Nations Temporary Commission on Korea was established to conduct elections in Korea. However, the Soviet Union refused to allow the commission to conduct elections in northern Korea, leading it to hold elections only in southern Korea. The resulting Constitutional Assembly election led to the establishment of the Republic of Korea (ROK) in the south in August 1948. Weeks later, Kim Il Sung established the Democratic People's Republic of Korea in the north, denouncing the UN as a rubber stamp for Western imperialism. On 12 December 1948, the Republic of Korea was officially recognized by the UN General Assembly under Resolution 195. (Note: The recognition was refused by Soviet Union and other communist states at the first time.) From that point, South Korea participated in the GA as an observer. Both South Korea and North Korea applied for membership in the UN in 1949, but no action was taken on their applications at that time as the Soviet Union opposed the admission of South Korea. South Korea applied in January 1949; the UN Security Council backed the motion, but it was vetoed by the Soviet Union. North Korea applied in February 1949, but the UN Security Council refused a Soviet proposal to refer the application to the Committee on the Admission of New Members.

In June 1950, North Korea invaded South Korea, and the Korean War commenced. The UN Security Council denounced the invasion, and "recommended that Members of the United Nations furnish such assistance to the Republic of Korea as may be necessary to repel the armed attack and to restore international peace and security in the area," and "that all Members providing military forces and other assistance...make such forces and other assistance available to a unified command under the United States of America," and authorized this new United Nations Command "at its discretion to use the United Nations flag in the course of operations against North Korean forces..." Sixteen nations responded by sending combat troops (and five other countries sent humanitarian aid) to support South Korea. The Soviet Union, a veto-wielding power, was absent and failed to prevent the UN resolution, having been boycotting proceedings since January 1950 in protest that the Republic of China and not the People's Republic of China held a permanent seat on the council. The Council President at the time was Norwegian Arne Sunde. UN's involvement in the Korean War in South Korea's defense became important to ROK's subsequent claims of legitimacy, while North Korea denounced UN involvement as being driven by the United States. South Korea had overwhelming support for its admission in the UN General Assembly, but it was repeatedly vetoed by the Soviet Union.

Coming with change of recognition in 1971 of the Chinese seat, North Korea also gained observer status in 1973. It also gained admission to the World Health Organization and established observer missions in New York City and Geneva. During annual UN General Assembly discussions, North Korean representatives demanded the withdrawal of U.S. troops from the Korean Peninsula and the disestablishment of the United Nations Commission for the Unification and Rehabilitation of Korea. South Korean President Park Chung Hee backed separate memberships for the two Koreas, but North Korean leader Kim Il Sung demanded DPRK membership as the sole representative of a unified Korea. Every fall, UN General Assembly became a battleground on the "Korean question", with Western Bloc countries introducing resolutions supporting ROK's legitimacy, while DPRK's partners introducing demands to dissolve the United Nations Command and the withdrawal of U.S. troops from South Korea. According to Balazs Szalontai, a professor of North Korean studies at Korea University in South Korea, North Korea initially refused to accept UN resolutions on Korea, as it could not match the more powerful South Korea, but became more eager to raise the issue after the number of pro-DPRK countries in the UN grew. In 1975, the UN passed two contradictory motions on Korea; Resolution 3390A supporting South Korea and Resolution 3390B supporting North Korea.

As the Cold War came to a close, South Korea announced in 1991 that it would seek its own membership in the UN. North Korea had previously opposed separate membership in the UN for itself and South Korea because it opposed the permanent recognition of "two Koreas". However, with no prospect of a Chinese or Soviet veto of South Korea's bid, North Korea announced that it would also seek UN membership, stating that North Korea "has no alternative but to enter the United Nations at the present stage" to avoid having "important issues related to the interests of the entire Korean nation [being] dealt with in a biased manner on the U.N. rostrum." North Korea submitted its application on 8 July 1991, followed by South Korea four weeks later. South Korea's Foreign Ministry welcomed North Korea's application, saying that separate memberships for the two Koreas would "greatly contribute to easing tension ... and also facilitate the process of peaceful reunification." The UN Security Council unanimously adopted Resolution 46/1, recommending both North Korea and South Korea for membership, with the two countries being admitted on 17 September 1991. The flags of the two countries were raised side by side outside the UN Headquarters.

The Democratic People's Republic of Korea (commonly known as North Korea) and the Republic of Korea (commonly known as South Korea) were simultaneously admitted to the United Nations on 17 September 1991. The United States amongst others sponsored their admission, and the U.S. ambassador at the United Nations General Assembly, Thomas R. Pickering, gave a very warm welcome to the seven nations joining that day.

=== North Korea and the UN (1991–present) ===
North Korea has never held a seat on the UN Security Council. It has a Permanent Mission to the UN in New York City, and additionally maintains a mission to the UN in Paris and an Ambassador to the UN at the UN Office at Geneva.

As of 2018, since 2005, the UNGA has adopted a resolution every year to condemn the human rights situation in North Korea.

In December 2019, US Ambassador to the United Nations Kelly Craft said during a meeting of the UN Security Council (which was called at her request) that the US was prepared to take "simultaneous steps" with North Korea to achieve peace. But she also warned the North Koreans against conducting further missile tests.

=== South Korea and the UN (1991–present) ===
South Korea has been a vigorous participant in the UN meetings, assemblies, and higher level meetings.

South Korea has thrice been elected to a non-permanent seat of the UN Security Council, first in the 1995 election for 1996–97 and again in the 2012 election for 2013–14, and most recently, in the 2022, for 2023-2024.

In 2001, Han Seung-soo of South Korea held the presidency of the UNGA. In 2006, Ban Ki-moon from South Korea was elected as the Secretary-General of the United Nations. He was re-elected in 2011.

== See also ==
- List of United Nations Security Council resolutions concerning North Korea
