= United Nations Memorial Cemetery =

War cemetery in Busan, South Korea

- 재한유엔기념공원
- Commission for the UNMCK (CUNMCK)
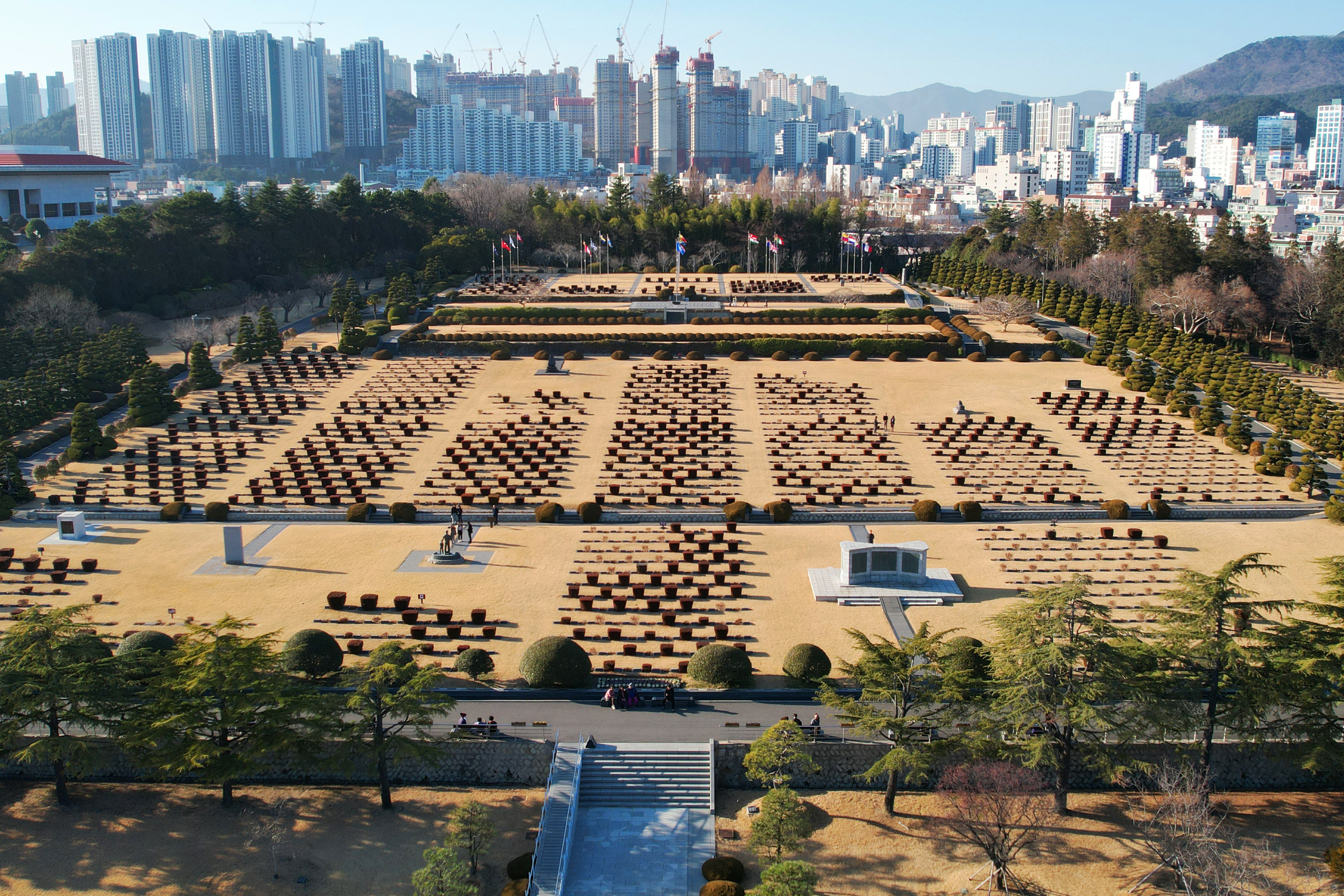
- UNMCK in 2026
- Used for those deceased 1950–53 plus UNC deceased post-war
- Established: January 18, 1951 (as the United Nations Military Cemetery (UNMC))
- Location: 35°7′41″N 129°5′49″E; 93 UN Pyeonghwa-ro, Nam-gu, Busan, 608-812, Republic of Korea (Old address: 779 Daeyon 4-dong, Nam-gu, Busan)
- Total burials: 2,300

Burials by nation
- United Nations Command (UNC): British Commonwealth Forces Korea; United Kingdom: 892; Canada: 381; Australia: 281; New Zealand: 32; South Africa: 11; Turkey: 462; Netherlands: 123; France: 47; Republic of Korea: 36 – ROK Army soldiers serving in UNC units including KATUSA, KATCOM; United States: 40; Colombia: 4; Belgium: 1; Norway: 1; Thailand: 1; Non-combatants: 11; Unknown: 5

- United Nations Memorial Cemetery
- Hangul: 재한유엔기념공원
- Hanja: 在韓유엔記念公園
- RR: Jaehan Yuen ginyeom gongwon
- MR: Chaehan Yuen kinyŏm kongwŏn

The United Nations Memorial Cemetery in Korea (UNMCK; Korean: 재한유엔기념공원; RR: Jaehan Yuen ginyeomgongwon), located at Tanggok in the Nam District, of Busan, (Note: As a transliteration from Korean, the city name 부산 (Korean pronunciation: [pusʰan]) was typically spelled "Pusan" in McCune-Reischauer until 2000. The official Revised Romanization spells the name Busan. See "Pusan: South Korea". Geographical Names. Archived from the original on 6 April 2012.) South Korea, is a burial ground for United Nations Command (UNC) casualties of the Korean War. (Note: The Korean War started on 25 June 1950 when North Korean forces pushed south of the 38th parallel which divided Korea following World War II. With authorization from the United Nations, forces from the United States and other nations pushed the North Koreans back to the north. When these UN forces approached China, Chinese forces intervened and the battlefront eventually stabilized along the 38th parallel. The Korean Armistice was signed on 27 July 1953 to end the fighting.) It contains 2,300 graves and is the only United Nations cemetery in the world. Laid out over 14 hectares (35 acres), the graves are set out in 22 sites designated by the nationalities of the buried servicemembers.

== History ==
=== Temporary battlefield cemeteries and remains recovery ===
The Korean War began when North Korean People's Army forces attacked south in June 1950. As the fighting progressed, temporary military cemeteries for battle casualties were established by United Nations forces near the towns of Taejon (9 July 1950), Kwan-ui (Kwan-ni), Kumchon, and Sindong. When the North Korean forces pushed towards Busan, these cemeteries had to be abandoned.

Later, as the Battle of Pusan Perimeter developed, temporary cemeteries were established at Masan, Miryang, and Taegu, with a Busan cemetery being established on 11 July 1950. As the fighting pushed into North Korea, temporary cemeteries were established in or near the towns of Kaesong, Sukehon, Wonsan, Pupchong (Pukchong County), Yudarn-ni and Koto-ri. Some eleven division-level cemeteries were established in the first two months of fighting and later five UN military cemeteries were established in North Korea.

At the beginning of the war, the nearest U.S. Army mortuary affairs unit was the 108th Graves Registration Platoon in Yokohama, Japan, which was searching for the remains of missing World War II American airmen. The only other American active duty graves registration unit was at Ft. Bragg, North Carolina. The 108th was reconfigured as the 114th Graves Registration Company and deployed to establish temporary cemeteries at Hungnam, Pyongyang, and Suchon as the fighting continued.

Supporting the 2nd Infantry Division was the Graves Registration Section of the second Quartermaster Company, which collected the remains of Allied and American soldiers to be further processed by the 148th Graves Registration Company. When UN forces launched the Inchon Invasion in September 1950, a platoon from the 565th Graves Registration Company accompanied them. Other mortuary affairs units included the 293rd Graves Registration Company, activated in April 1951. It was difficult to recover remains and conduct burials in Korea, due to the rugged geography and harsh climate, and the threat of unexploded ordnance and booby-traps.

=== Construction of the Tanggok cemetery ===
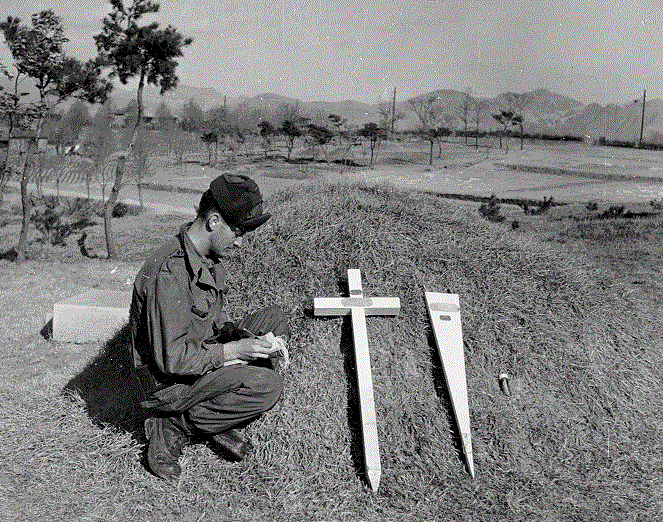
A corporal from the 114th Graves Registration Co. fills out a Form 52B, giving information regarding a deceased American soldier at the U.N. Cemetery at Taegu. Nearby are a cross, a triangular unidentified soldier marker, and small bottle containing Form 1042 which is buried with the casualty. US Army Photo, 23 January 1951

Construction of the United Nations Military Cemetery (UNMC) at Tanggok began on 18 January 1951 and was carried out by hand-labor over a 28.2 hectares (70 acres) site. It was dedicated by General Matthew Ridgway on 6 April 1951. Graves Registration units then concentrated American and allied remains at Tanggok before they were permanently buried or repatriated.

Besides burial services, refrigeration units to store remains were added, as were cremation facilities. Casualties from the Colombia Battalion were cremated at Tanggok by the American Graves Registration Service and then repatriated to Colombia in 1954. Today the 2,300 graves in the cemetery are set out in 22 sites designated by the nationalities of the buried service members.

=== Post-armistice ===
Following the signing of the Korean Armistice Agreement in July 1953, the United Nations Command sought to recover bodies interred in North Korean territory. Cemeteries for POWs in North Korea were established at 16 POW camps. From September to October 1954, the resulting exchange of casualties, dubbed Operation Glory, between United Nations forces and the North Koreans resulted in 4,219 remains being recovered, of which 1,275 were non-US casualties. Also exchanged were the remains of approximately 14,000 North Korean and Chinese casualties. From 1950 to 1954, approximately 11,000 casualties were interred at UNMC, which was maintained by the United States Army Graves Registration Agency.

=== Foundation as a United Nations cemetery and transfer to CUNMCK ===
It was officially established as the United Nations Memorial Cemetery on 15 December 1955 with the passage of UN General Assembly Resolution 977(X). Following the war, the cemetery was funded from the United Nations budget, but the Sino-Soviet world objected to this funding. In 1973, the cemetery was transferred from the UN to the Commission for the United Nations Memorial Cemetery (CUNMCK), which is composed of representatives from the 11 countries who have servicemembers buried there.

=== Cultural heritage and tourism ===
The cemetery is designated as Site 359 in the listing of Registered Cultural Heritage Sites in Korea by the Cultural Heritage Administration of Korea. Also, it is a visitor attraction for Pacific Rim tourists. In 2011, United Nations Secretary-General Ban Ki-moon described it as the only United Nations cemetery in the world.

== Memorials ==
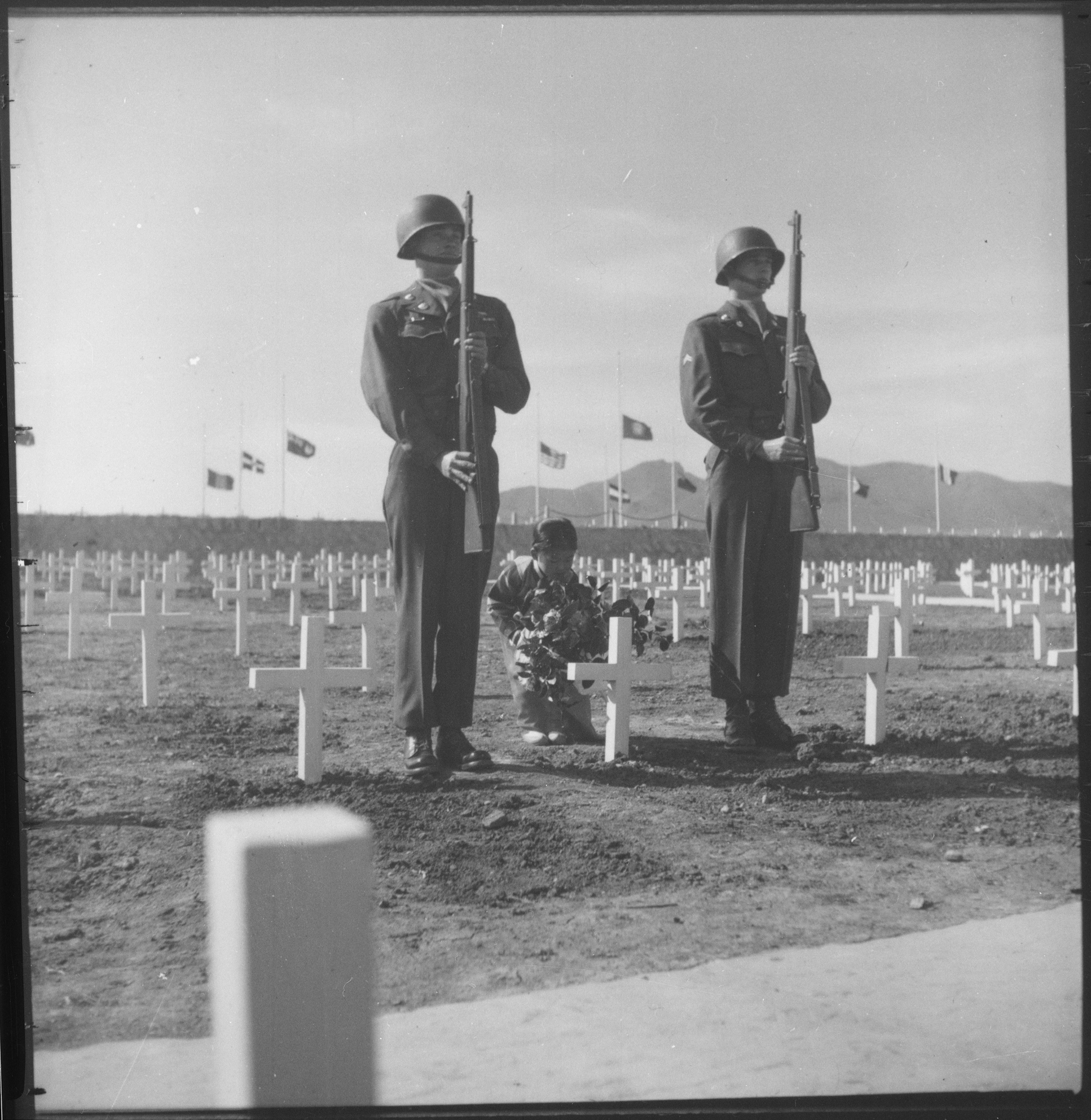
April 1951 – a Korean girl places a wreath of flowers while an honour guard present arms at the United Nations cemetery in Busan.

An Honour Guard from the Republic of Korea 53rd Division carries out flag ceremonies daily.

The UN Sculpture Park was established in October 2001 and twenty-nine permanent memorials are in the cemetery. The memorials include:

- Commonwealth of Nations memorials:
  - Australian Memorial
  - British Memorial – dedicated 2010
  - Monument to Canadian Fallen – an identical monument is located in downtown Ottawa
  - Commonwealth Memorial
    - Commonwealth Missing in Action Memorial
  - New Zealand Memorial – designed by Warren and Mahoney architects and built of marble from the Coromandel Peninsula
  - South Africa Memorial – the 2001 sculpture Reconciliation by South African sculptor Strijdom van der Merwe, was created as part of the International Sculpture Symposium
- French Memorial – dedicated 2007
- Greek Memorial – dedicated 1961
- Interfaith memorial chapel – built by the United Nations Command in 1964
- Main gate – designed by Korean architect Kim Joong-up and built by the city of Busan in 1966. The end of the eight pillars supporting the roof was designed as a bowl and a symbol representing the moment and the eternity, expressing a soft and solemn standing for the soldiers.
- Memorabilia display hall – built by the UN in 1968
- Norwegian Memorial
- Thai Memorial – dedicated November 2008
- Turkish Memorials I and II – dedicated 1960, 1962, and 2008
- UN Forces Monument – dedicated 1978 and refurbished in 2007
- United States Korean War Memorial – the Frank Gaylord sculpture was carved from Barre Granite at the Rock of Ages Corporation in Barre, Vermont, and dedicated under the auspices of the American Battle Monuments Commission in 2013
- The Unknown Soldiers' Pathway

The Wall of Remembrance, completed in 2006, has the names of the 40,896 United Nations casualties (killed and missing) inscribed on 140 marble panels.

== Notable graves ==
The cemetery contains the graves of 2,289 military personnel and 11 non-combatants.

- Bill Madden GC, 3rd Battalion, Royal Australian Regiment, who died as a prisoner of war.
- Kenneth Muir VC, Argyll and Sutherland Highlanders, who was killed in action in the Battle of Hill 282.
- Philip Curtis VC, Duke of Cornwall's Light Infantry, who was killed in action in the Battle of the Imjin River while serving with the Gloucestershire Regiment.
- Lt. Col. Charles Hercules Green DSO, commander of the 3rd Battalion, Royal Australian Regiment, who was mortally wounded at Battle of Chongju and died at nearby Anju.
- Dutch Lt. Col. Marinus Petrus Antonius den Ouden, commander of the Regiment Van Heutsz, who was killed in action during Operation Roundup in 1951 and is buried with members of his regiment – posthumously, den Ouden was awarded Netherlands' highest military award, the Military Order of William.
- Journalist Christopher Buckley, early days of the war, he died from a land mine explosion, and was buried at the cemetery.
- Bill Speakman, died 2018, Korean War veteran and Victoria Cross recipient: buried in 2019.

== Burials ==
=== Total burials ===
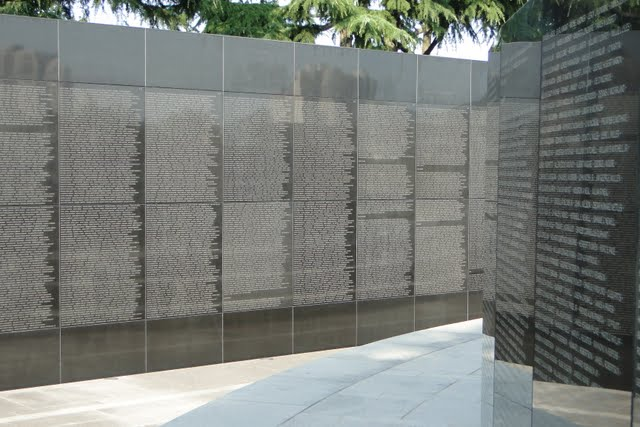
UNMCK Wall of Remembrance

Between 1951 and 1954 there were about 11,000 burials of UN troops from 21 countries. As of 2012, there are 2,300 wards of eleven countries, including 36 of the Republic of Korea troops deployed to the United Nations military bases. Burials of seven countries' graves were retrieved back to their homeland, including Belgium, Colombia, Ethiopia, Greece, Luxembourg, Philippines and Thailand. The burials of British Commonwealth Forces Korea are located in the United Nations Memorial Cemetery. The numbers are 885 British troops, in accordance with the English customs of the dead.

- Number of burials: as of July 2023
- Number of participants, killed soldiers and personnel: as of 2014

States	Participants	Killed	Burials
United Kingdom	56,000	1,078	890
Turkey	21,212	966	462
Canada	26,791	516	381
Australia	17,164	340	281
Netherlands	5,322	120	122
France	3,421	262	47
United States	1,789,000	36,516	40
New Zealand	3,794	23	32
South Africa	826	36	11
Norway	623	3	1
Colombia	5,100	213	–
Greece	4,992	192	–
Thailand	6,326	129	–
Ethiopia	3,518	122	–
Philippines	7,420	112	–
Belgium	3,498	99	–
Luxembourg	100	2	–
Sweden	1,124	–	–
Denmark	630	–	–
India	627	–	–
Italy	128	–	–
UN Total	1,957,616	40,732	–
South Korea	–	–	38
Non-combatants	–	–	4
Unknown soldiers	–	–	11
Total	–	–	2,320

=== Burials after armistice ===
Since the Korean Armistice Agreement in July 1953, there have been some burials.

==== Korean War veterans ====
Since 2015, burials of Korean War veterans were officially allowed.

#	Name	Nationality	Date of burial	Notes
1	Raymond Joseph Benard	France	2015-05-15	
2	Robert Steed Holman McCotter	United Kingdom	2015-11-11	
3	Bernard James Delahunty	United States	2016-02-20	
4	Nicolas Frans Wessels	Netherlands	2016-05-12	
5	Andre Belaval	France	2016-10-27	
6	Johan Theodoor Aldewereld	Netherlands	2017-09-27	
7	William Speakman	United Kingdom	2019-02-19	
8	Wilhelm Cornelis de Buijzer	Netherlands	2019-03-12	
9	Albert Hugh Mcbride	Canada	2019-06-12	
10	Kurt Dressler	United States	2019-11-30	
11	Boyd L. Watts	United States	2020-04-07	
12	Russll Harold Johnstad	United States	2020-11-27	
13	Hwang Doo-suk	South Korea	2020-11-27	KATUSA attached to 25th Infantry Division
14	John Robert Cormier	Canada	2022-06-21	
15	Mathias Hubertus Hoogenboom	Netherlands	2022-11-11	
16	Eduard Julius Engberink	Netherlands	2022-11-11	
17	James Raymond Grundy	United Kingdom	2022-11-11	
18	Robert Eugene Jean Desire Picquenard	France	2022-11-12	
19	Lee Young-cha	South Korea	2023-02-09	KATUSA attached to 7th Infantry Division
20	José Sergio Romero	Colombia	2023-11-11	
21	José Gustavo Pascagaza León	Colombia	2023-11-11	
22	Luis Carlos García Arcila	Colombia	2023-11-11	
23	Jorge Sánchez Tapia	Colombia	2023-11-11	
24	Bryan James Laurenson	United Kingdom	2023-11-11	
25	Brian Wood	United Kingdom	2023-11-11	
26	Léon Jules Ghislain Bosquet	Belgium	2023-11-15	
27	Ferdinand Titalepta	Netherlands	2024-05-02	
28	Rod Asanapan	Thailand	2024-11-11	

===== Veterans buried in another place =====
#	Name	Nationality	Date of burial	Notes
1	Jean Le Houx	France	2017-11-02	Buried near Arrowhead Hill in the Korean Demilitarized Zone

==== Unknown soldiers ====
#	Soldiers	Nationality	Site of excavation	Date of burial	Notes
1	3	United Kingdom	2: Hill 234 in Paju; 1: Youngpyeong Mountain in Paju	2021-11-11	South Korea and US experts estimated that they are Gloucestershire Regiment members in the Battle of Imjin River and Battle of Papyong Mountain.

==== Others ====
Members of United States Forces Korea, Co-interment and so on

#	Name	Nationality	Date of burial	Notes
1	Richard S. Whitcomb	United States	1982-07-20	He was a Korean War Veteran
2	Archibald Lloyd Hearsey	Canada	2012-04-25	He was buried in the same grave (Joseph William Hearsey) as his brother He was also a Korean War Veteran.
3	Olwyn Green	Australia	2023-09-21	She was buried in the same grave (Charles Green) as her husband.

== See also ==
- Daejeon National Cemetery
- Seoul National Cemetery
- War Memorial of Korea
- Cemetery for North Korean and Chinese Soldiers, established in Paju, South Korea
- Recovery of US human remains from the Korean War
- United Nations and North Korea
- United Nations and South Korea
- United Nations in popular culture
- United Nations Forces in the Korean War
- Medical support in the Korean War
