= Richard Whitcomb =

Richard Whitcomb, may refer to:

- Richard S. Whitcomb (1894–1982), a United States Army general
- Richard T. Whitcomb (1921–2009), an American aeronautical engineer
