= General Pickett =

General Pickett may refer to:

- George Pickett (1825–1875), Confederate States Army major general
- Harry K. Pickett (1888–1965), U.S. Marine Corps major general

== See also ==
- John L. Pickitt (1933–2020), U.S. Air Force lieutenant general
