= Regiment van Heutsz =

Regiment Van Heutsz
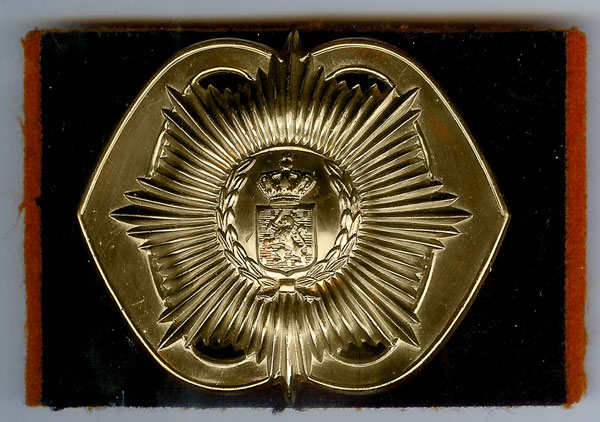
- Cap badge of the Regiment Van Heutsz with backing
- Active: 1 July 1950–Present
- Country: Netherlands
- Allegiance: United Nations; Netherlands
- Branch: Army
- Type: Line infantry
- Role: Air Assault Infantry
- Size: 1 battalion
- Garrison/HQ: Schaarsbergen
- Patron: Jo van Heutsz
- Colors: Black and Orange
- March: Van Heutsz Mars
- Engagements: Korean War: Battle of the Soyang River 1951; Hill 325, Iron Triangle 1951; Koje-do Island POW revolt 1952; Hill 340, Iron Triangle, 1953; War in Afghanistan
- Decorations: Military William Order, US Presidential Unit Citation, ROK Presidential Unit Citation, Dutch Cross for Justice and Freedom
- Battle honours: Hoensong-Wonju; Soyang

Commanders
- Notable commanders: Lt. Col. M.P.A. den Ouden †; Lt. Col. W.D.H. Eekhout; Lt. Col. G.H. Christian; Lt. Col. C.M. Schilperoord

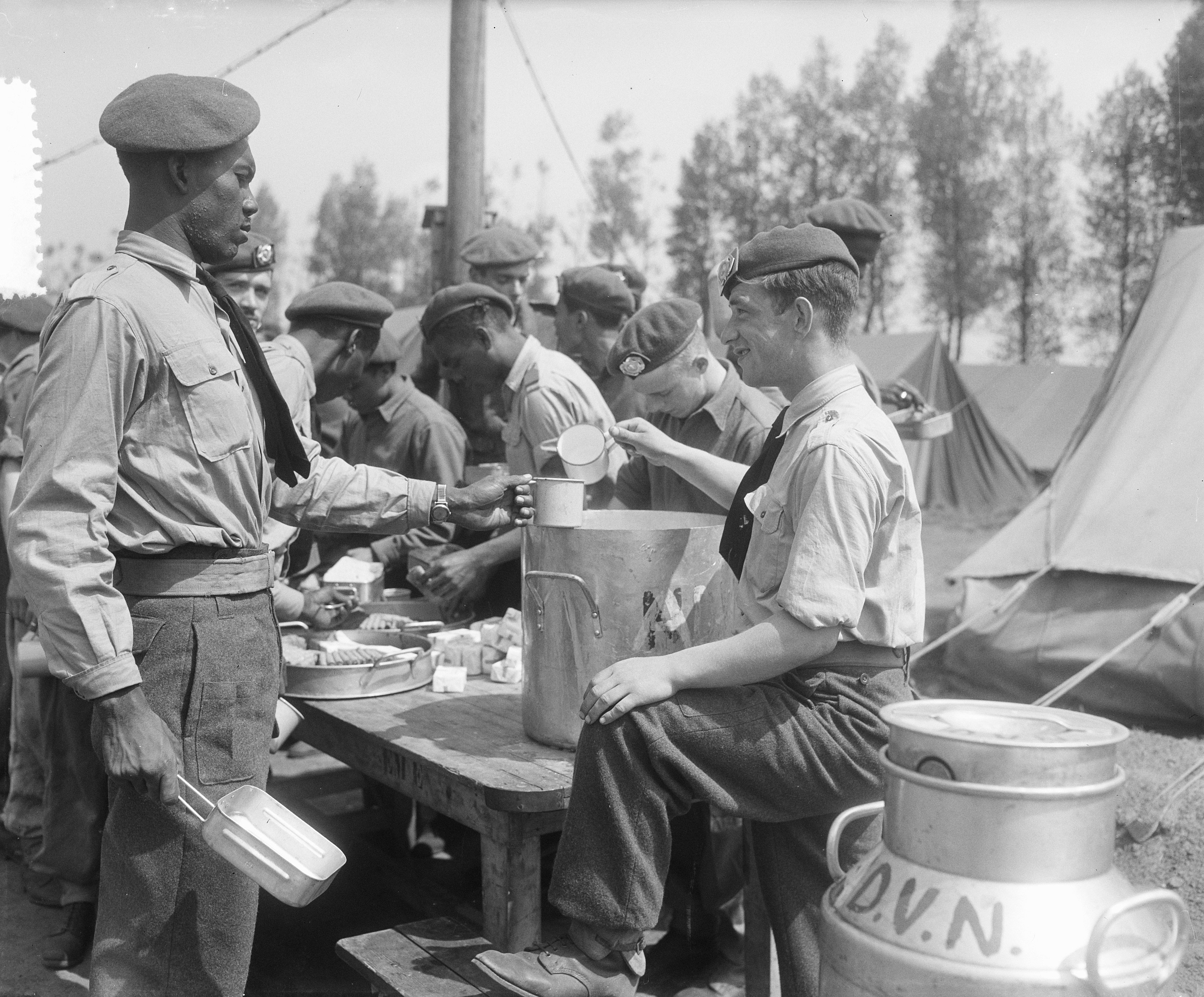
Surinamese Korea Volunteers from the regiment at training camp in Roosendaal

The Regiment Van Heutsz is a line infantry regiment of the Royal Netherlands Army. The regiment was named after J.B. van Heutsz, a former Governor-General of the Dutch East Indies who successfully brought the Aceh War closer to an end, and was formed on July 1, 1950. It is notable for its service as part of the United Nations force sent to fight during the Korean War. It is still operational and has served tours as part of the ISAF Afghanistan mission.

== Origin ==
From 1832 to 1950 a substantial colonial army was maintained in the Dutch East Indies under the title of the Royal Netherlands East Indies Army (KNIL). Following Indonesian independence the Dutch and indigenous personnel of this force were demobilised but with the establishment of the Regiment Van Heutsz on July 1, 1950, the traditions and distinctions of the KNIL were transferred to the new regiment. These included the inscription 'Military Operations Royal Dutch East Indies Army 1816-1950', still carried on the King's Colour.

== Korean War ==
The Van Heutsz Regiment was incorporated into the Nederlands Detachement Verenigde Naties (NDVN) (Netherlands Detachment United Nations), which also included the Dutch Naval component sent to Korea. While 16,225 people volunteered for service in Korea, only 3,418 men were accepted and sent. 2,980 of those participated in the actual war, as the units that arrived after the armistice (July 27, 1953) did not participate in any fighting.

The Korean War battalion of Regiment Van Heutsz was formed on 9 September 1950. They left the Netherlands on October 26, 1950, and arrived Pusan on 23 November 1950, but took the detachment as its first battalion. The regiment has the battle honor Korea 1950–1954 on its colors. In Korea, the Van Heutsz troops (being understrength) were re-enforced by South Korean "KATCOM" troops. The Dutch served at three key battles, all around the Iron Triangle sector between 1951 and 1953.

Since the Regiment Van Heutsz did not have its colors in 1950, a Dutch flag that was used in Korea as the battle flag of the Nederlands Detachement Verenigde Naties became the regimental colour. This flag now has official status and is shown on every parade and function of the regiment in tandem with the Sovereign's Colour awarded years after (which makes the regiment the only one in the RNA to carry a UK-style strand of colours). American and Korean battle streamers, representing the US Presidential Unit Citation, are attached to this flag.

The Regiment suffered 116 Dutch and 20 attached-Korean soldiers killed in action, three soldiers are still MIA, while one Dutchman was taken prisoner and died in a North Korean POW camp. The Dutch casualties are buried at the United Nations Memorial Cemetery in Busan, including their commander, Lt. Col. Marinus Petrus Antonius den Ouden, who was killed in action during the Battle of Hoengsong in February 1951 (Den Ouden posthumously received the Netherlands' highest military award, the Military Order of William). A total of 381 soldiers were wounded. A total of 115 Surinamese soldiers also fought together with the Dutch, at least two died.

== Post Korean service and ISAF deployment ==
The traditions of the Regiment Van Heutsz are currently maintained by one battalion serving as part of 11 Luchtmobiele (Airmobile) Brigade:

- 12th Ranger Battalion RVH (formerly 12th Infantry Battalion 1st RVH) is one of three air assault infantry battalions within the air mobile brigade.

From 2006 to 2010, the battalion formed the basis of the battlegroup attached to Task Force Uruzgan, the primary Dutch component of the multi-national forces in Afghanistan. For this, the regiment was awarded with the battle honour "Noord-Kandahar 2006 en Uruzgan 2006-2009" for operations in Afghanistan, especially for combat operations in 2006 and 2007, the operation Tura Ghar in 2008-2009 and the actions of the doorgunners between 2006 and 2009.

== See also ==
- United Nations Forces in the Korean War
- Medical support in the Korean War
- Garderegiment Grenadiers en Jagers
- Regiment Stoottroepen Prins Bernhard
