= United Nations Security Council Resolution 335 =

UN Security Council Resolution 335
- Date: 22 June 1973
- Meeting no.: 1,730
- Code: S/RES/335 (Document)
- Subject: Admission of New Members to the UN
- Result: Adopted

Security Council composition
- Permanent members: China; France; Soviet Union; United Kingdom; United States
- Non-permanent members: Australia; Austria; Guinea; India; Indonesia; Kenya; Panama; Peru; Sudan; Yugoslavia

United Nations Security Council Resolution 335, adopted unanimously on June 22, 1973, after separately considering their applications, the Council recommended to the General Assembly that both the German Democratic Republic and the Federal Republic of Germany be simultaneously admitted.

== See also ==
- List of United Nations Security Council Resolutions 301 to 400 (1971–1976)
- United Nations Security Council Resolution 702
- Germany and the United Nations
