= United Nations and South Korea =

Republic of Korea

United Nations membership
- Membership: Full member (admitted)
- Since: 17 September 1991
- UNSC seat: Non-permanent
- Permanent Representative: Hwang Joon-kook

South Korea (officially the Republic of Korea) has engaged with the United Nations since the end of World War II. After Korea was divided along the 38th parallel, the UN created the United Nations Temporary Commission on Korea (UNTCOK) in 1947. Its goal was to oversee elections and help form a government in the South. When the Korean War began in 1950, the UN took military action under a UN Security Council resolution. For decades, South Korea only held observer status. It became a full UN member on 17 September 1991, along with North Korea (officially the Democratic People’s Republic of Korea), under General Assembly Resolution 46/1. Since joining, South Korea has been active in peacekeeping, development, climate action, and humanitarian aid.

== History ==
The Korean Peninsula was under Japanese rule until the end of World War II. After the war, it was divided along the 38th parallel. The Soviet Union controlled the North, while the United States controlled the South. The UN set up UNTCOK in 1948 to support Korea’s unification through free elections. But the Soviet Union blocked access to the North, so elections were only held in the South. This led to the creation of the Republic of Korea in August 1948.

In June 1950, North Korea invaded South Korea, starting the Korean War. The UN Security Council condemned the attack and called for military help to member states to South Korea. The United Nations Command (UNC) was formed, a multinational force primarily composed of U.S. troops. It fought alongside South Korean forces in response to the conflict. The UN also helped with armistice negotiations, which led to a ceasefire in 1953. However, no peace treaty was ever signed. Efforts like the Panmunjom Declaration have since aimed to improve relations and explore reunification.

== Membership ==
South Korea officially became a UN member on 17 September 1991, alongside North Korea. Before that, it had been an observer since 1949. Since gaining full membership, South Korea has actively participated in various UN bodies and initiatives.

In December 1948, the UN General Assembly adopted Resolution 195 (III), recognizing South Korea as the only legal government on the peninsula. This was based on elections held under UN Temporary Commission observation in the South. Following this, South Korea participated in the General Assembly as an observer. In 1949, both South Korea and North Korea applied for UN membership. However, their applications were not acted upon due to the Soviet Union's opposition to South Korea's admission.

On 25 June 1950, North Korea invaded South Korea, initiating the Korean War. The UN Security Council passed Resolution 82, condemning the invasion and calling for North Korea's withdrawal to the 38th parallel. After that, Resolution 83 recommended that UN member states provide military assistance to South Korea. Resolution 84 established a unified command under the United States and authorized the use of the UN flag during operations. Sixteen nations contributed combat troops, and five others provided humanitarian aid to support South Korea.

In 1971 Resolution 2758 was passed by the UN General Assembly. It recognized the People's Republic of China as the legitimate representative of China at the UN. Following this change, North Korea was granted observer status in 1973. As the Cold War drew to a close, South Korea announced in 1991 its intention to seek UN membership. North Korea, which had previously opposed separate memberships, also applied, stating that it had no alternative but to enter the UN to ensure its interests were represented. The UN Security Council unanimously recommended the admission of both countries, and on 17 September 1991, both North Korea and South Korea were admitted as UN member states.

== Engagement ==
South Korea has contributed troops and personnel to numerous UN peacekeeping missions around the world, such as the Sangnoksu Unit. It's also an advocate for human rights within the UN system and has participated in the work of the Human Rights Council and other related bodies.

South Korea has increased its contributions to UN development and humanitarian agencies, reflecting its growing economic capacity and commitment to global development goals, for example, it provided funding to support the UN Found for Afghanistan in 2025 and it has participated in UN climate change negotiations and has committed to reducing its greenhouse gas emissions.

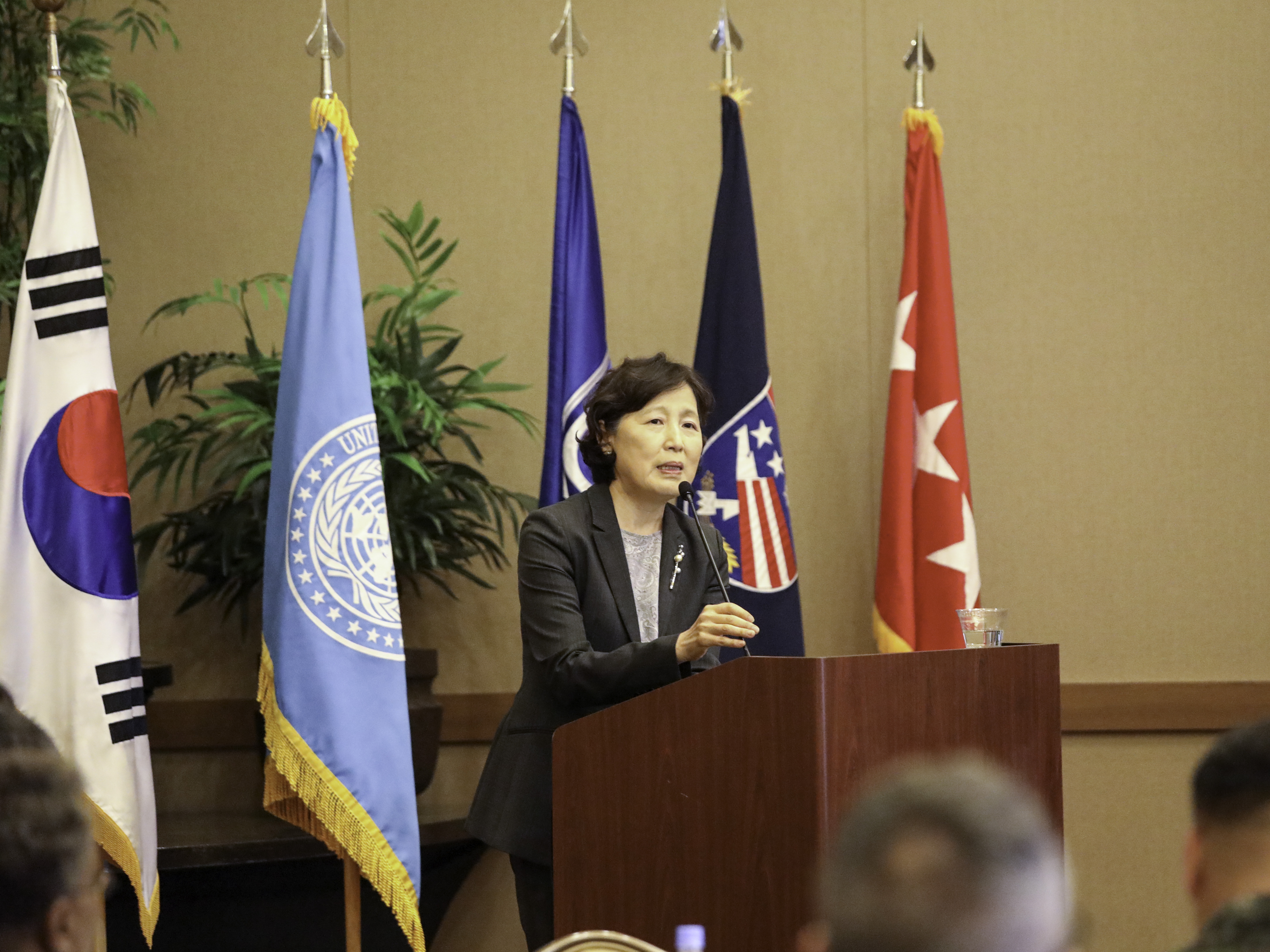
United Nations Command, United States Forces Korea, hosts the Women, Peace, and Security Symposium at U.S. Army Garrison Humphreys, Republic of Korea, 13-14 June 2023.

South Korea has served as a non-permanent member of the UN Security Council on two occasions (1996-1997 and 2013-2014), playing a role in addressing global peace and security issues: During 1996-1997 South Korea focused on improving the transparency of the Security Council, providing humanitarian assistance to refugees, and expanding the Council’s capacity to resolve regional conflicts. As the Council’s president in May 1997, South Korea led an open debate on humanitarian aid in conflict situations and helped adopt four resolutions (1107-1110) and eight presidential statements.

== See also ==
- Foreign relations of South Korea
- Korea and the United Nations
- United Nations Command
- United Nations and North Korea
- United Nations Memorial Cemetery
