= 1995 United Nations Security Council election =

Election to the United Nations Security Council

- 8 November 1995

5 of 10 non-permanent seats on the United Nations Security Council
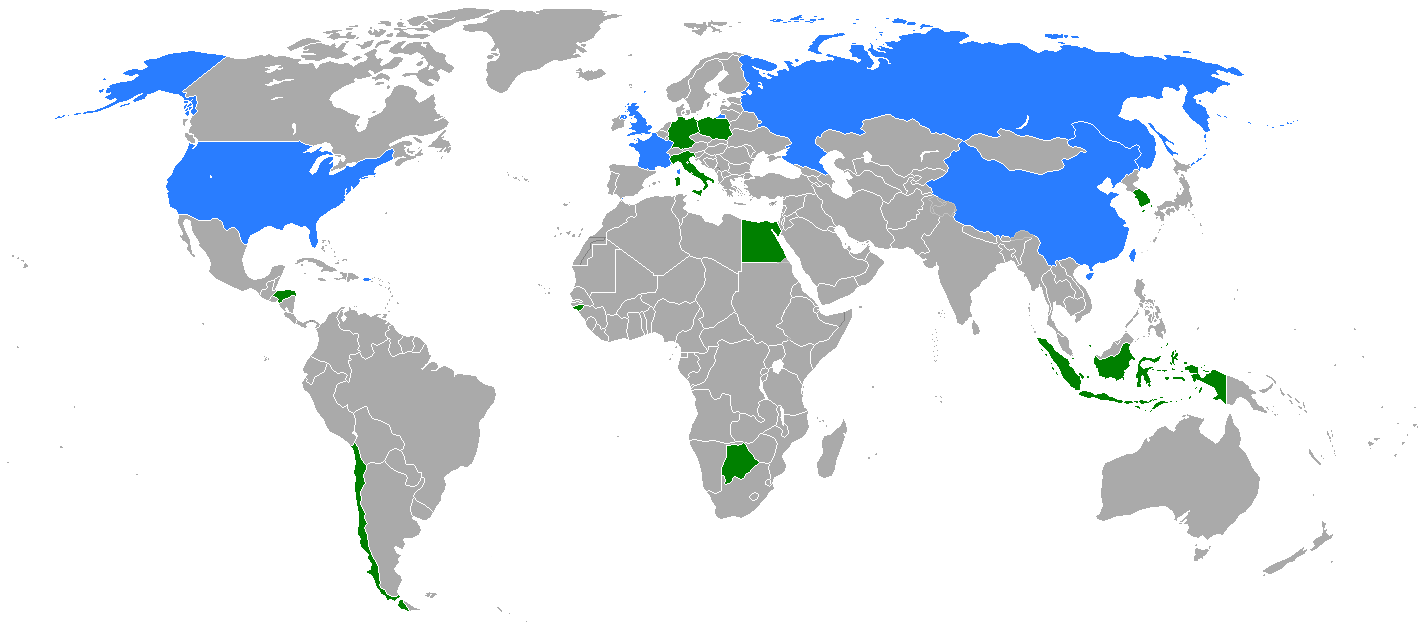
- United Nations Security Council membership after the election Permanent members Non-permanent members
- Outgoing members Rwanda (Africa) Nigeria (Africa) Oman (Asia)^{a} Argentina (GRULAC) Czech Republic (EEG) a. Arab state Elected members Guinea-Bissau (Africa) Egypt (Africa)^{a} South Korea (Asia) Chile (GRULAC) Poland (EEG)

- Unsuccessful candidates
- Albania (EEG)
- Benin (Africa)

The 1995 United Nations Security Council election was held on 8 November 1995 at United Nations Headquarters in New York City during the 50th session of the United Nations General Assembly. The General Assembly elected five non-permanent members of the UN Security Council for two-year terms commencing on 1 January 1996.

The five candidates elected were Chile, Egypt, Guinea-Bissau, Poland, and the Republic of Korea with Guinea-Bissau and South Korea being elected for the first time.

== Geographic distribution ==
In accordance with the General Assembly's rules for the geographic distribution of the non-permanent members of the Security Council, and established practice, the members were to be elected as follows: two from Africa, one from Asia, one from Latin American and the Caribbean Group (GRULAC), and one from the Eastern European Group.

== Candidates ==
There was a total of seven candidates for the five seats. The seats of the Asian Group and GRULAC were not contested, with single candidates applying for them: Chile and the Republic of Korea, respectively. For the two seats reserved for African nations, there were three candidates: Benin, Egypt, and Guinea-Bissau; the election was only significantly contested between Benin and Guinea-Bissau, as Egypt's candidacy was to fill the unofficial seat reserved for members of the Arab League (being vacated by Oman). For the single seat of the Eastern European Group, there were two candidates: Albania and Poland. Of these, a number were the official endorsed candidates of their respective regional groups. These endorsements were as follows:

- African Group: Egypt and Guinea-Bissau
- Asian Group: Republic of Korea
- GRULAC: Chile

Pellumb Kulla of Albania, speaking for the Eastern European Group, said that the Group was not in a position to endorse a candidate. As the representative of Albania, he then presented his own countries candidature.

== Results ==
Voting proceeded by secret ballot. For each geographic group, each member state could vote for as many candidates as were to be elected. There were 177 ballots in each of the three elections.

=== African and Asian States ===
African and Asian States election results
| Member | Round 1 |
| Egypt | 159 |
| Republic of Korea | 156 |
| Guinea-Bissau | 128 |
| Benin | 60 |
| Ghana | 1 |
| Tunisia | 1 |
| abstentions | 0 |
| invalid ballots | 0 |
| required majority | 118 |

=== Latin American and Caribbean States ===
Latin American and Caribbean States election results
| Member | Round 1 |
| Chile | 168 |
| Mexico | 1 |
| abstentions | 7 |
| invalid ballots | 1 |
| required majority | 113 |

=== Eastern European Group ===
Eastern European States election results
| Member | Round 1 |
| Poland | 128 |
| Albania | 48 |
| abstentions | 0 |
| invalid ballots | 1 |
| required majority | 118 |

=== End result ===
The election was ended in a single round of voting, with Albania and Benin losing to Poland and Guinea-Bissau, respectively, and the other candidates running unopposed. This led to the result of Chile, Egypt, Guinea-Bissau, Poland, and the Republic of Korea being elected to serve two-year terms at the United Nations Security Council commencing 1 January 1996.

== See also ==
- List of members of the United Nations Security Council
- Korea and the United Nations
