= Richard S. Whitcomb =

United States Army general (1894–1982)

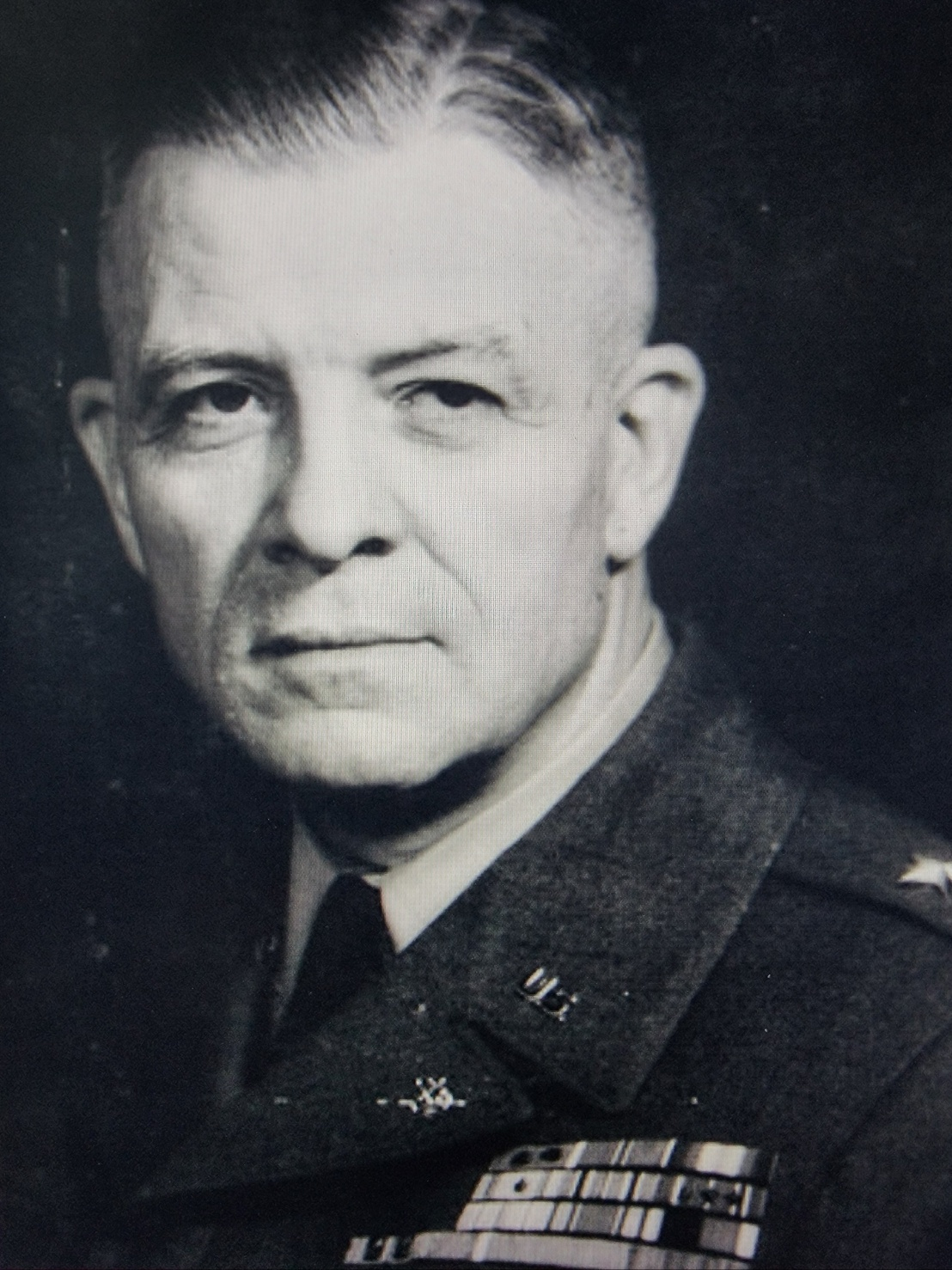
- Whitcomb circa 1953
- Born: December 27, 1894; Kansas, United States
- Died: July 12, 1982 (aged 87); South Korea
- Burial place: United Nations Memorial Cemetery, Busan
- Spouse: Han Myo-suk (m. 1964)
- Children: Min Taejung
- Military career
- Allegiance: United States
- Branch: United States Army
- Service years: ? – 1955
- Rank: Brigadier General
- Commands: Korean War
- Awards: ROK Order of Civil Merit (1st Class) Mugunghwa Medal (posthumously inscribed)

Richard Seabury Whitcomb (27 December 1894 – 12 July 1982) was a United States Army general who served in World War I, World War II, and the Korean War.

In particular, during and after the Korean War, he helped the Korean people who suffered from the war, in every way he could.

== Early life ==
Whitcomb was born in Kansas, on 27 December 1894.

== Military career ==
As a Major during World War II, Whitcomb served in Iceland (1941-1943) and was the commander of the U.S. Army's 11th Port Company in England and France (1943-1945). He was promoted to Brigadier General soon after World War II and served as the U.S. Army's port commander in Manila, Philippines during the mid-1940s.

During the Korean War, Whitcomb was appointed as a commander of the 2nd Logistics Command, Busan in 1953. In November 1953, shortly after the signing of the armistice, there took place a big fire in a Busan refugee shantytown. At that time, he did not hesitate to unpack clothes and food from the military warehouses for more than 30,000 victims of the unprecedented fire. For that matter, he was summoned to the U.S. Congress to answer questions about his abuse of authority as a wartime military commander.

== Later life ==
He left the United States Army in February 1955. he stayed in South Korea and dedicated the rest of his life to restoration project of postwar South Korea and exhumation of remains of US soldiers who were killed during the Battle of Chosin Reservoir, also known as the Battle of Lake Changjin.

He died in 1982 and he was buried in United Nations Memorial Cemetery in Busan.

== Contributions to the Korean people ==
General Whitcomb was indeed “an American who loved Korea more than Koreans”. He made the following dedicated efforts to help the many Koreans suffering from the Korean War:

- Relief efforts for the big Busan fire

In November 1953, a fire that started in a refugee shantytown spread to Busan Station, burning more than 6,000 homes, causing 29 casualties and displacing more than 30,000 people. When the cold set in and all supplies were scarce and there was no way to help them, General Whitcomb, the military commander of the 2nd Logistics Command in Busan, did not hesitate to open the munitions depot, build tents for the victims, and provide food and clothing.

- Supported the construction of medical facilities such as Maryknoll Hospital

When medical facilities for refugees and war orphans were severely lacking, General Whitcomb collected one percent of every American soldier's paycheck and personally took to the streets in a Korean traditional costume, Hanbok, to raise money. With these funds, several large hospitals were built in the Busan area, including Maryknoll Hospital.

- Supported the creation of Pusan National University's Jangjeon Campus

When Whitcomb heard that Pusan National University (PNU), which had been established as a comprehensive national university in 1946, was struggling with a shortage of campus land, he was concerned. He convinced President Syngman Rhee and the governor of Gyeongnam Province to give 165.3 hectares (500,000 pyong) of previously Japanese-owned land to the university free of charge. Whitcomb also provided construction materials for campus facilities through the Korean Civilian Assistance Corps (KCAC) program and assigned his engineering troops to help build adjacent roads.

== Legacy ==
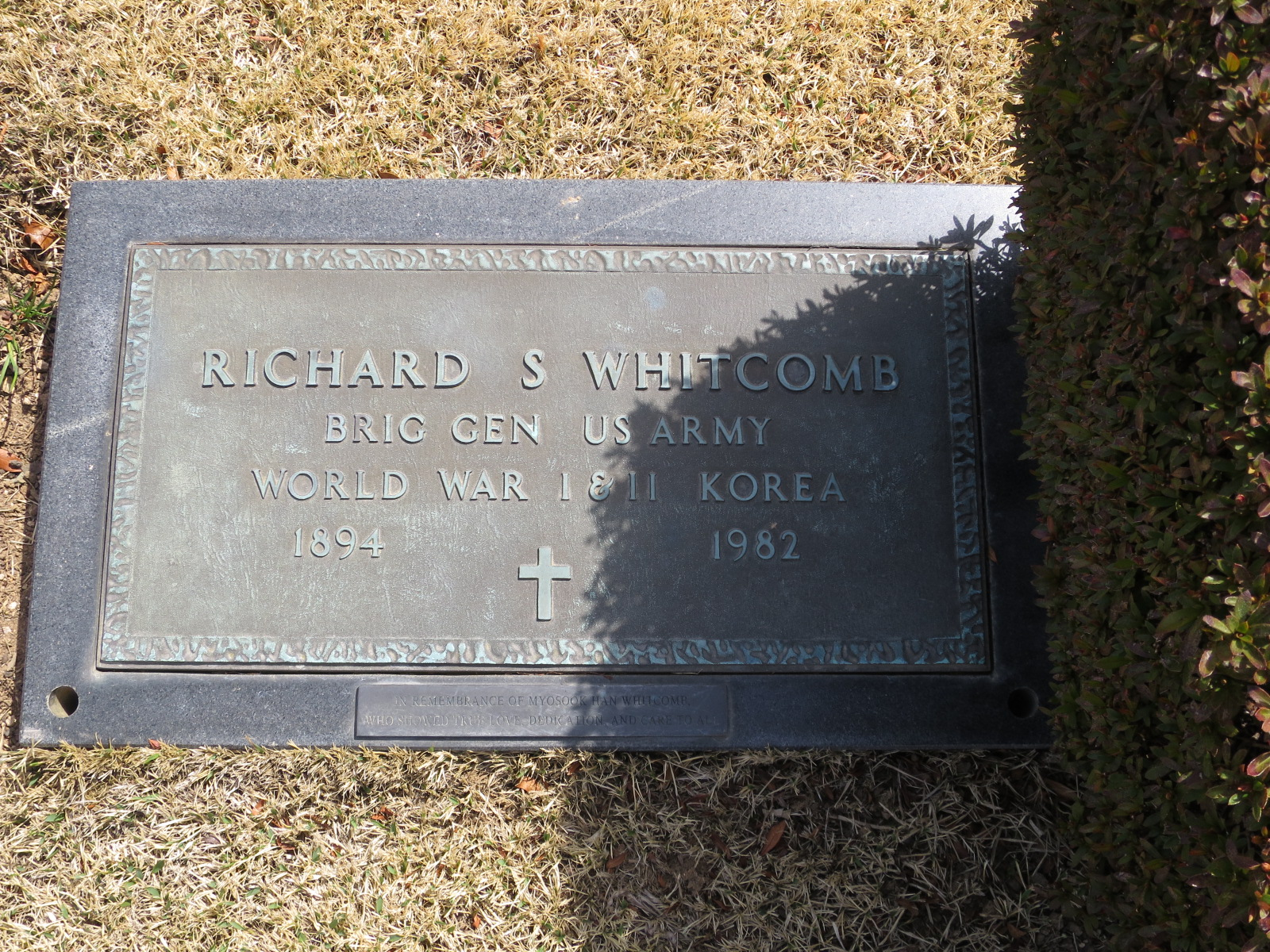
Whitcomb's grave at the UN Memorial Cemetery

After Whitcomb returned to South Korea, he founded the U.S.-Korea Foundation to support war orphans and to exhume and repatriate the remains of U.S. soldiers in North Korea. He met and married Han Myo-suk (1927 - 2017), who was running Iksunwon, South Korea's first childcare center, in Cheonan. After his death in 1982, the facility was expanded and developed into the Whitcomb House of Hope Foundation (President Han Myo-suk).

On the occasion of the 70th anniversary of the U.S.-ROK Alliance, a commemorative sculpture of Whitcomb was erected in Busan with voluntary donations from Busan citizens. The sculpture, depicting Whitcomb walking hand-in-hand with a war orphan, was unveiled on November 11, 2023, at Peace Park next to the United Nations Memorial Cemetery in Busan.

== Honors ==
In November 2022, Whitcomb received Order of Civil Merit - Mugunghwa Medal from the Republic of Korea posthumously.

This Medal of Honor was presented by Prime Minister Han Duck-soo to Whitcomb House of Hope Foundation President Min Taejung on November 11, 2022, during the “Turn Toward Busan” ceremony at the United Nations Memorial Cemetery in Busan.
