= United Nations and North Korea =

Democratic People's Republic of Korea

United Nations membership
- Membership: Full member (admitted)
- Since: 17 September 1991
- UNSC seat: Non-permanent (never elected)
- Permanent Representative: Kim Song

North Korea, officially the Democratic People's Republic of Korea (DPRK), has maintained a complex relationship with the United Nations (UN) since its founding in 1948. Initially opposing the concept of dual membership for the Korean Peninsula, the DPRK did not join the organization until 17 September 1991, when both North and South Korea were admitted under General Assembly Resolution 46/1. Since then, the UN has been involved in the country through humanitarian assistance and the implementation of sanctions in response to its nuclear and missile programs. Currently, relations between the DPRK and the UN are characterized by limited cooperation and ongoing diplomatic and security-related tensions.

== History ==
The Korean Peninsula was under Japanese rule until the end of World War II. Following the war, it was divided along the 38th parallel, with the Soviet Union administering the North and the United States administering the South. The UN became involved early on, establishing the United Nations Temporary Commission on Korea (UNTCOK) in 1948 to facilitate the unification of Korea through free elections. However, the Soviet Union denied UNTCOK access to the North, and elections were only held in the South, leading to the establishment of the Republic of Korea in August 1948.

There was an outbreak of the Korean War in June 1950, when North Korea invaded the South. The UN Security Council, in the absence of the Soviet Union, passed resolutions condemning the invasion and authorizing member states to provide military assistance to South Korea. This led to the formation of the United Nations Command (UNC), a multinational force primarily composed of U.S. troops, which fought alongside South Korean forces to repel the North Korean aggression. The UN played a role in the armistice negotiations that ultimately ended the active fighting in 1953, although a formal peace treaty has never been signed, there are other efforts among the Korea's such as the Panmunjom Declaration, an agreement for peace and reunification of the Korean Peninsula.

== Membership ==
In 1949, both North Korea and South Korea applied for UN membership. However, their applications were not acted upon due to the Soviet Union's opposition to South Korea's admission.

On 25 June 1950, North Korea invaded South Korea, initiating the Korean War. The UN Security Council, in the absence of the Soviet Union, which was boycotting the council, passed Resolution 82, condemning the invasion and calling for North Korea's withdrawal to the 38th parallel. Subsequently, Resolution 83 recommended that UN member states provide military assistance to South Korea. Resolution 84 established a unified command under the United States and authorized the use of the UN flag during operations. Sixteen nations contributed combat troops, and five others provided humanitarian aid to support South Korea. In 1971, the UN General Assembly passed Resolution 2758, recognizing the People's Republic of China as the legitimate representative of China at the UN. Following this change, North Korea was granted observer status in 1973.

As the Cold War drew to a close, South Korea announced in 1991 its intention to seek UN membership. North Korea, which had previously opposed separate memberships for decades, also applied, stating that it had no alternative but to enter the UN to ensure its interests were represented. The UN Security Council unanimously recommended the admission of both countries, and on 17 September 1991, both North Korea and South Korea were admitted as UN member states.

== Engagement ==
Since the mid-1990s, the United Nations’ technical agencies have served as a vital bridge between North Korea and the global community Notably, six Agencies with offices in Pyongyang have delivered key humanitarian aid and technical assistance to the country: WFP, UNICEF, WHO, FAO, UNFPA, and UNDP.

The World Food Programme (WFP) has provided food assistance to North Korea since the mid-1990s, addressing malnutrition and food shortages, particularly for vulnerable populations such as children and pregnant women since 1995. The program has faced challenges due to political tensions, sanctions, and border closures, but it has continued to support humanitarian efforts.

UNICEF has worked on improving child health and nutrition, including vaccination campaigns and maternal health support since the mid-1990s. North Korea also has a permanent mission to the UN in New York City, Paris, and Geneva, although it has never had a seat on the UN Security Council.

The World Health Organization (WHO) has targeted over 2 million beneficiaries to provide essential life-saving medicines and equipment to strengthen prevention and control of communicable and non- communicable diseases, improve maternal and children’s health, including immunization services. Also the WHO works to strengthen technical and managerial capacity at the Ministry of Health and in primary and secondary healthcare facilities and to develop health systems.

The Food and Agriculture Organization (FAO) targeted more than 513,000 beneficiaries in ten provinces. The priority was to provide farms with critical inputs that are essential for increasing production as well as productivity, such as soybean seeds, vegetable seeds, mushroom spores, small farm equipment and fertilizers/pesticides.

The United Nations Population Fund (UNFPA) benefitted an estimated 396,000 pregnant women through increasing access to quality reproductive health services through provision of essential medicines, emergency obstetric care, equipment to health facilities and training of health care providers. Also: training of midwives, support of maternal death surveillance and family planning services and the only population census so far.

The United Nations Development Programme (UNDP) is a development-oriented Agency that was present in North Korea since 1979. UNDP support focused on sustainable use of conventional energy, management of waste, multilateral environmental agreements and in disaster management. UNDP worked to promote integrated pest management, promoting small and medium enterprises to widen opportunities for income generation with a focus in rural areas and agricultural diversification. In addition, UNDP is responsible for in-country aid coordination through the Resident Coordinator system.

Food shortages have worsened with droughts, the UN estimates more than 10 million people (40% of the population) are facing severe food shortage. China is currently the biggest aid donor for North Korea.

North Korea has never contributed troops to UN peacekeeping missions, primarily due to UN Security Council sanctions, since it faces restrictions that limit its ability to participate in global military cooperation.

== Sanctions ==
North Korea has been the subject of numerous UN Security Council resolutions due to its nuclear weapons and ballistic missile programs, which are considered violations of the Treaty on the Non-Proliferation of Nuclear Weapons (NPT) and other international norms.

The UN has conducted investigations into human rights violations in North Korea, including the 2014 Commission of Inquiry Report on Human Rights in the DPRK, which documented widespread abuses.

Between 2006 and 2017, the Security Council adopted multiple resolutions imposing economic and military sanctions, including restrictions on exports of coal, iron, textiles, and refined petroleum products. These sanctions were intended to pressure the regime to abandon its nuclear program, although with limited success.

== See also ==
- List of United Nations Security Council resolutions concerning North Korea
- Korea and the United Nations
- United Nations and South Korea
