= Medical support in the Korean War =

During the Korean War, six countries—Sweden, India, Denmark, Norway, Italy, and West Germany—provided medical support to South Korea and the United Nations Forces. They provided a range of medical services, including the provision of mobile field hospitals; medical professionals, including doctors and nurses; hospital beds; equipment; and ambulances. Some of these personnel were killed during the conflict, though they were not combatants against North Korea and the People's Republic of China.

== Countries ==
=== Sweden ===
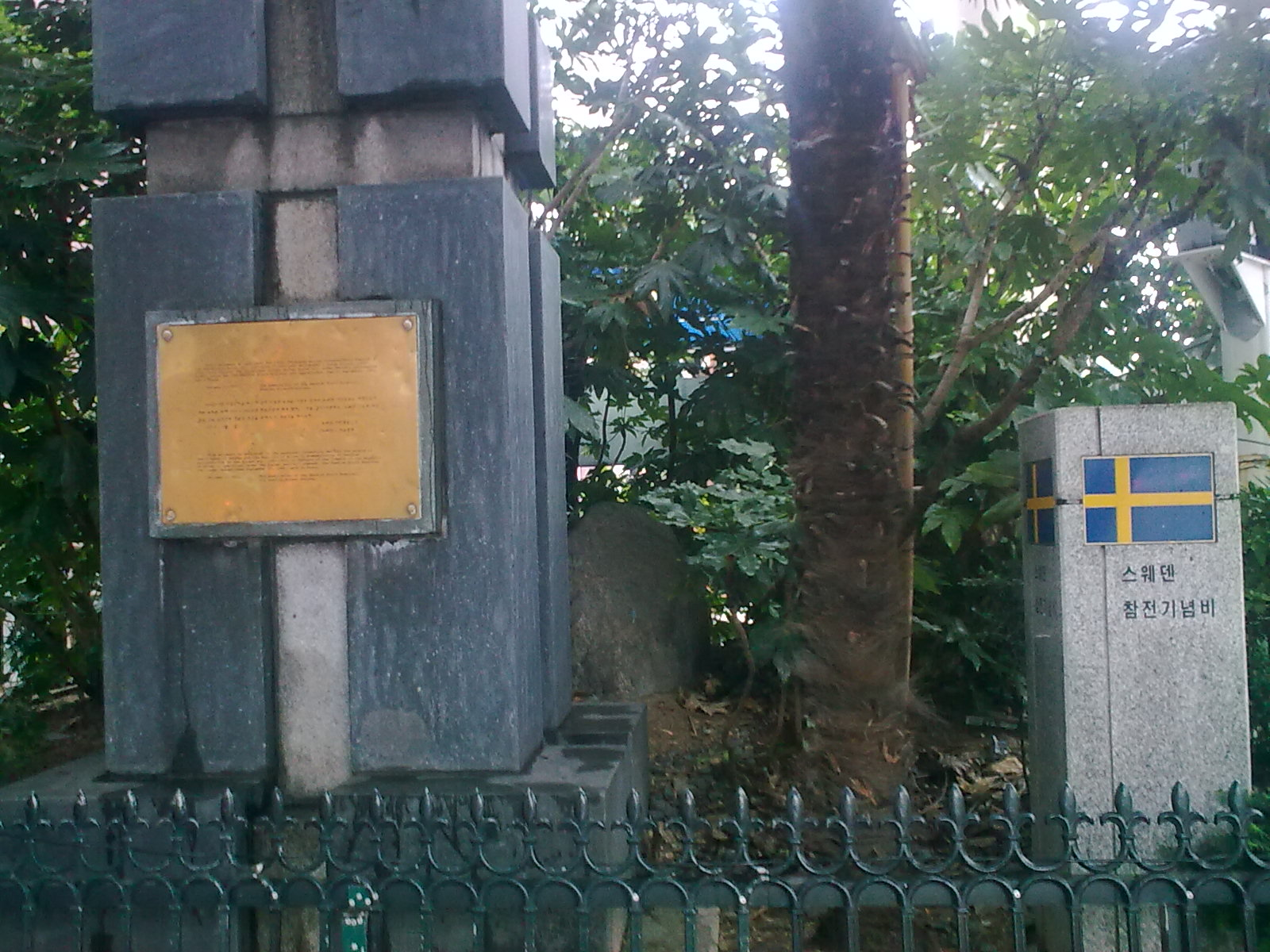
Monument to the Swedish medical aid effort in Busan, 2009

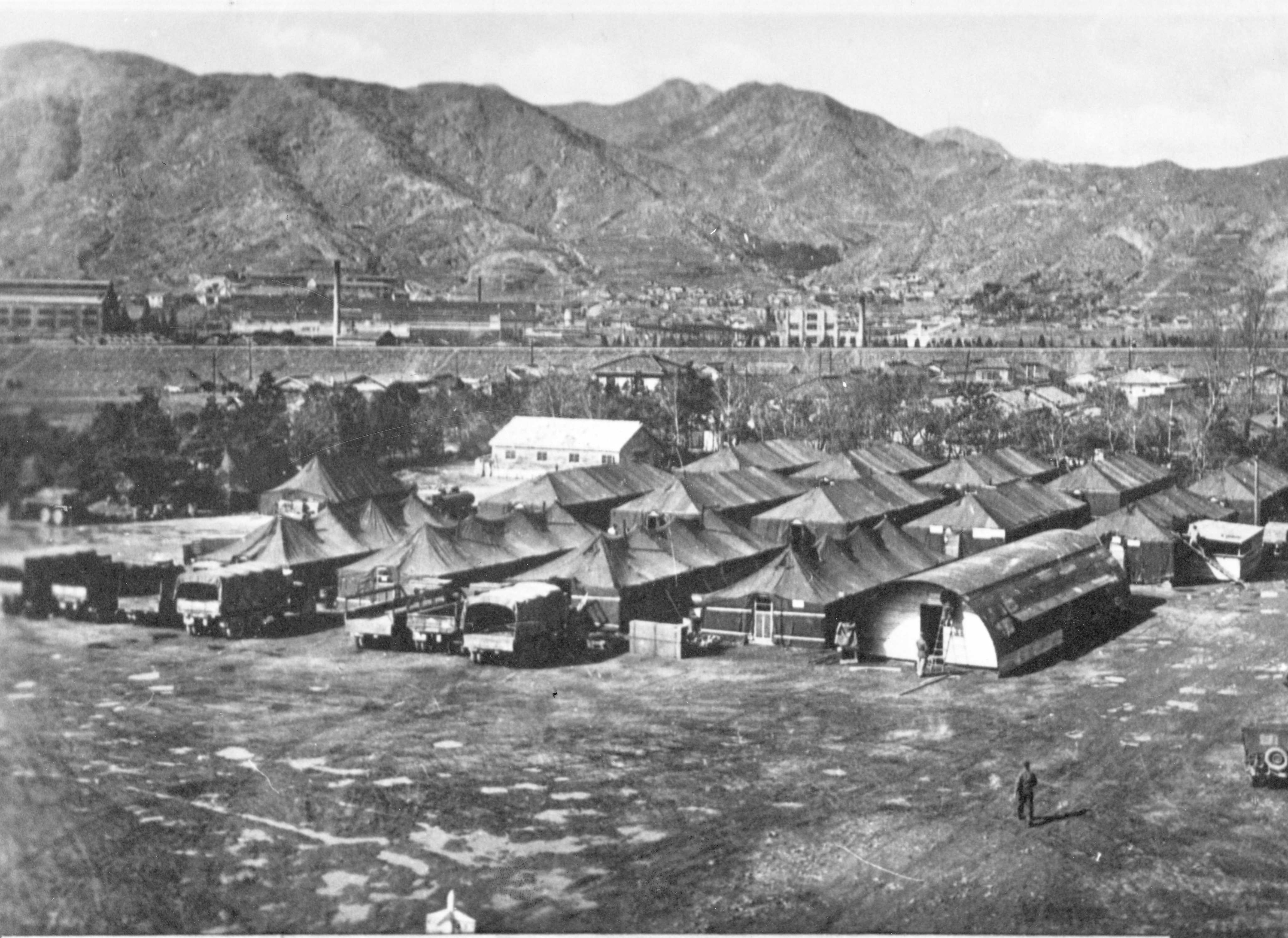
The Swedish Red Cross Field Hospital in Busan, 1950

The Swedish Red Cross Field Hospital was established by the Swedish mission sent to Korea to deal with the humanitarian crisis. Following the North Korean invasion, the UN Security Council adopted a resolution asking all UN member states to support South Korea. The Swedish government responded on 14 July 1950, by authorizing the dispatch of a 200-bed mobile field hospital. Shortly before his death, King Gustaf V announced that the Swedish state would cover the hospital's expenses. The Swedish Red Cross Field Hospital personnel arrived in Korea on 23 September 1950, and began medical support on 25 September 1950. Deciding that a stationary 400-bed Evacuation Hospital would be more valuable than the smaller but more mobile field hospital, which opened at the beginning of October, the Swedish hospital was converted and moved to the compound of the Commercial Middle School in Pusan, where it remained until 1958.The hospital was expanded to 600 beds by the end of the war, staffed by 174 Swedish doctors and nurses at any one time, all belonging to the Swedish Red Cross. Among its patients was the ROK Army Major Park Chung-in.

After the ceasefire in July 1953, the institute changed its name to 'Swedish Hospital in Pusan'. The hospital stayed comparatively unchanged as a civilian hospital until it was closed in March 1957. The closing ceremony was held on 20 March 1957, and personnel left soon afterwards. A small advisory group from Sweden stayed in Korea to advise on medical practices until autumn 1958. Over the duration of the conflict, 1,124 Swedish men and women served in the Swedish hospital, and 19,100 United Nations and 2,400 Korean personnel were treated by Swedish doctors. At the closing ceremony, the hospital received the Republic of Korea Presidential Citation. Some personnel received the Korean Order of Military Merit.

Because of Sweden's reputation for neutrality during the major 20th century conflicts (First World, Second World and Korean Wars), Sweden was included as one of the four founding members of the Neutral Nations Supervisory Commission. Several Swedish military personnel served in Korea enforcing the Panmunjom armistice. Sweden was the first Western European country to establish diplomatic relations and an embassy in North Korea.

=== India ===
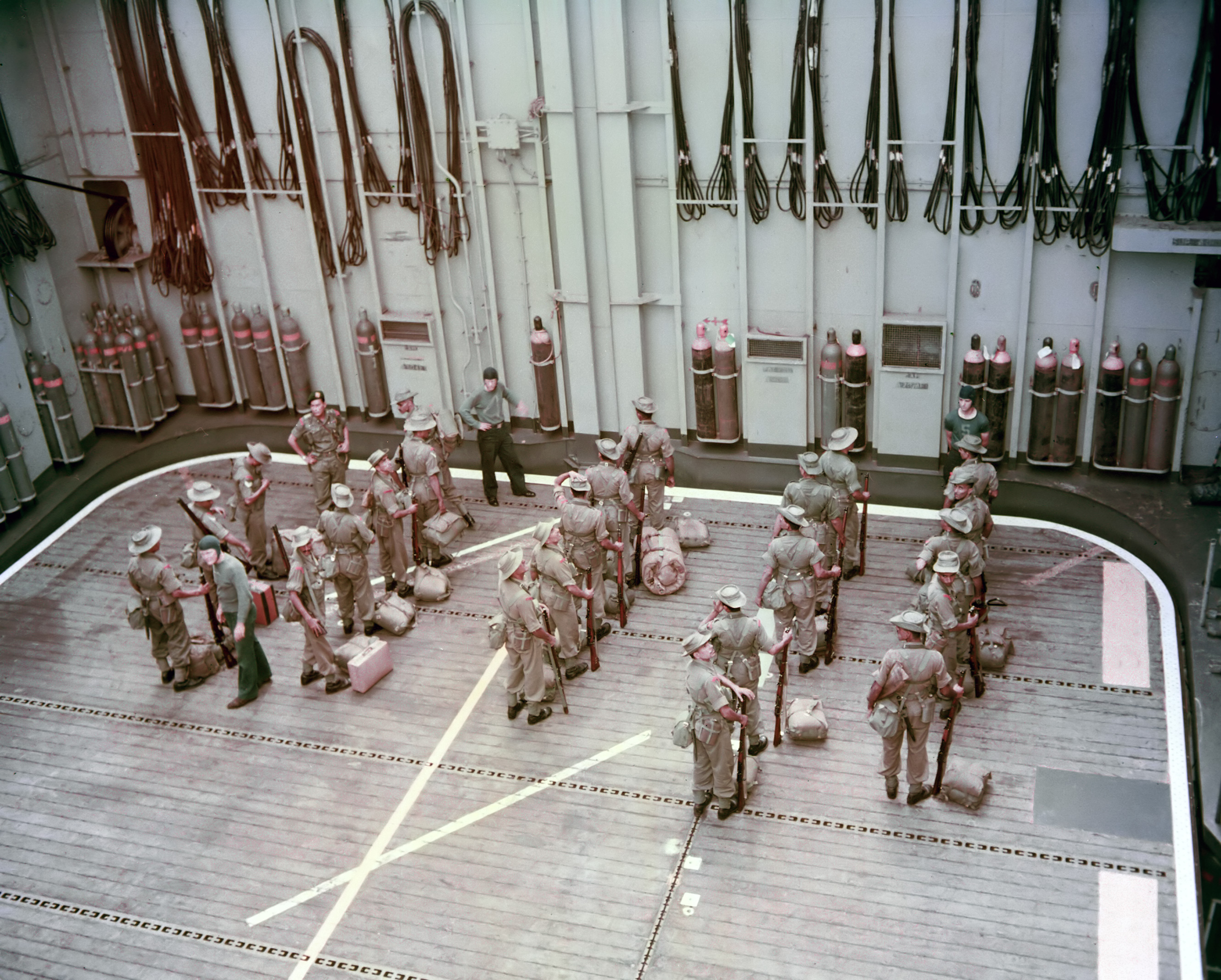
Indian troops on the USS Point Cruz preparing to be flown by helicopter to the Korean Demilitarized Zone, 7 September 1953

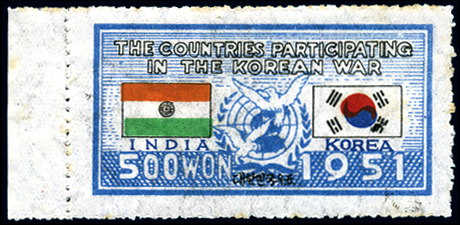
South Korean stamp commemorating the role of India's 60th PFA, 1951

After the outbreak of the Korean War on 25 June 1950, India decided to provide a medical unit. The 60th Parachute Field Ambulance (60th PFA), commanded by Lieutenant Colonel A. G. Rangaraj, arrived on 20 November 1950 and began to operate on 6 December 1950 at the Pyongyang front. Indian forces departed from Bombay in October 1950 arrived in Busan on 22 November 1950. The Indian Army deployed four combat surgeons, two anesthesiologists, one dentist and an estimated total of 346 servicemen permanently for the duration of the conflict. The units were sent after intense lobbying by V.K Krishna Menon to both the UN forces and the Indian Government. This was the first deployment of forces to international territory by the newly independent nation under an UN mandate. India also chaired the Neutral Nations Repatriation Commission for peaceful repatriation of prisoners of war.

The main unit was attached to the British 27th Infantry Brigade and the 1st Commonwealth Division and provided medical support at the front, while the detachment served in the hospital at Daegu, providing services to the UN Forces, South Korean Army, and Korean civilians. Elements from the group were attached to 187 Airborne Regimental Combat Team. Around 20,000 soldiers and civilians were treated from November 1950 to February 1954. By the end of the conflict, the unit would aid over 195,000 civilians and performed nearly 2,300 surgeries in the warfield. Around 100 North Korean soldiers who refused to be repatriated to the either state were also sent back to India. After Operation Tomahawk on 21 March 1951, two members of the unit were awarded with the Maha Vir Chakras and six Vir Chakras while the 60th PFA was awarded the President's Trophy on 10 March 1955. Four soldiers would receive an ROK Order of Military Merit and unit was also given a United States Meritorious Unit Commendation. Indian units would partake in 103 combat operations and ran four hospitals in South Korea to train field doctors and nurses. A total of 627 Indian troops were deployed prior to departure of all Indian units on 23 February 1954,following the armistice.

The Indian forces experienced three casualties and 26 soldiers were captured as prisoners of war. Indian Army officer—Colonel M. K..Unni Nayar, part of the United Nations Korea Committee, died on 12 August 1950 when he was killed in a mine accident near Waegwan. He was buried in Daegu, and his wife was interred in the same grave in 2012. A memorial to him in Suseong District, Daegu was unveiled on 7 December 1950.

=== Denmark ===
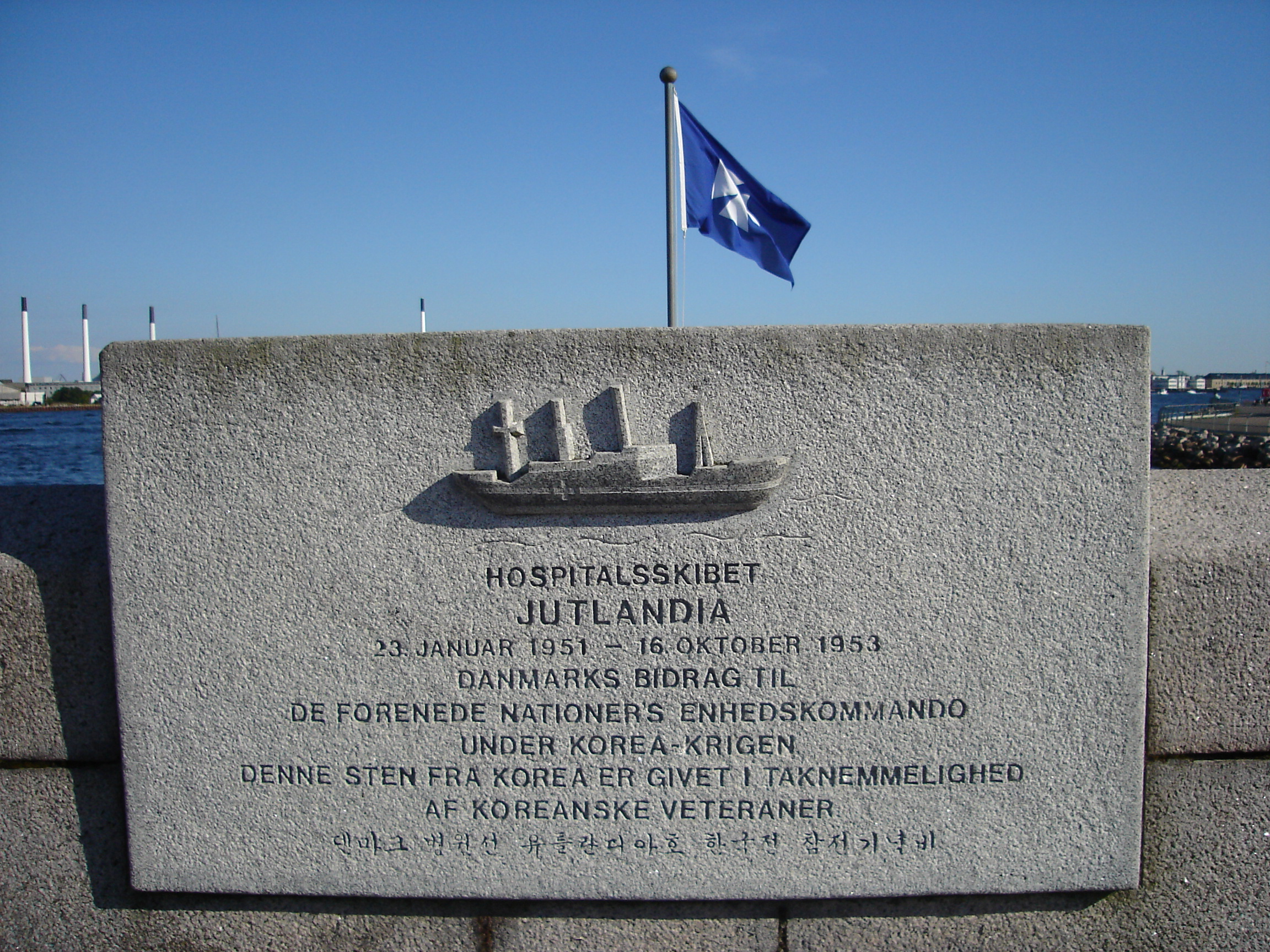
Memorial of MS Jutlandia in Copenhagen, 2009

Denmark supplied the MS Jutlandia under the Danish Red Cross for the duration of the war.

=== Norway ===
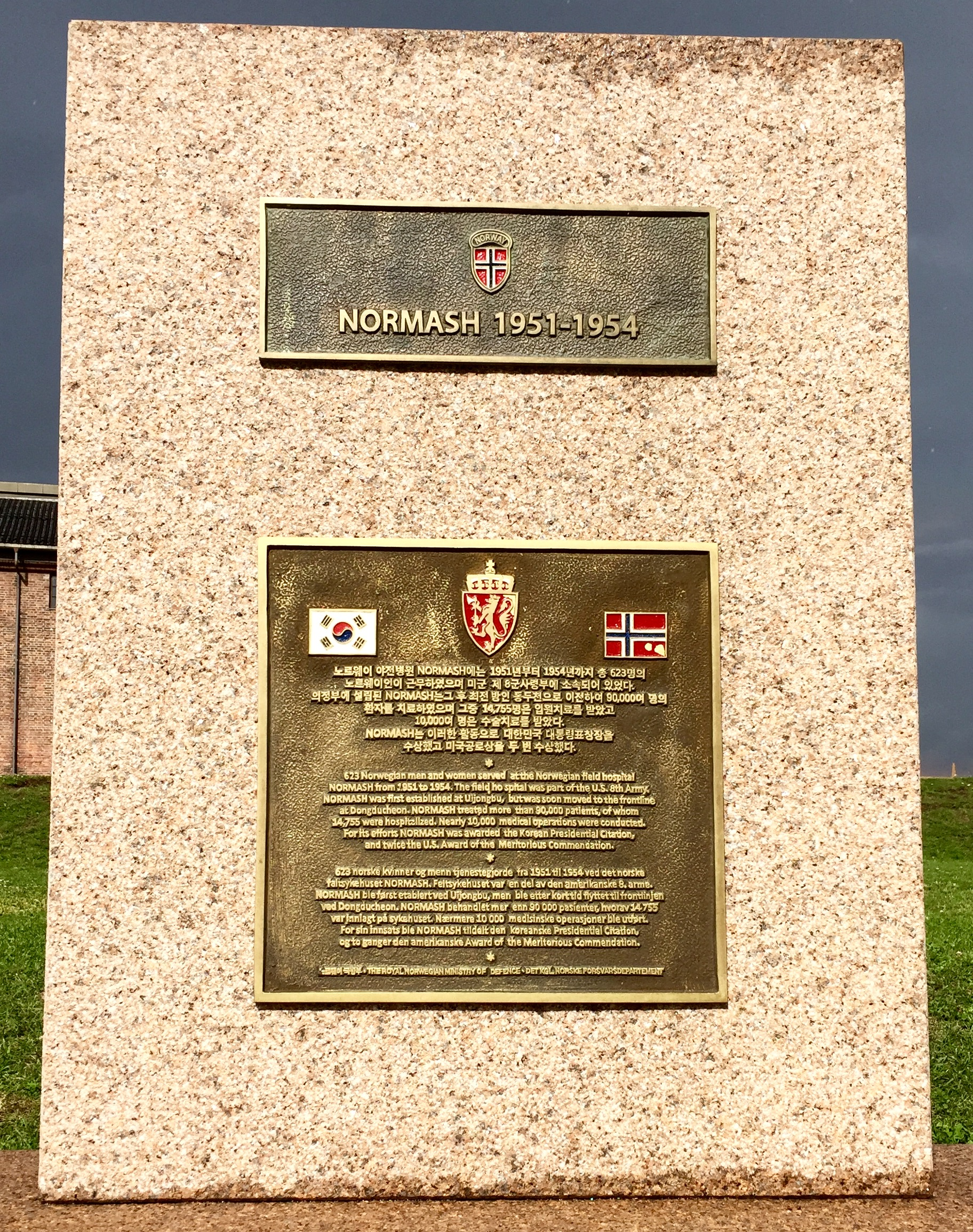
Memorial of NORMASH in Oslo, 2016

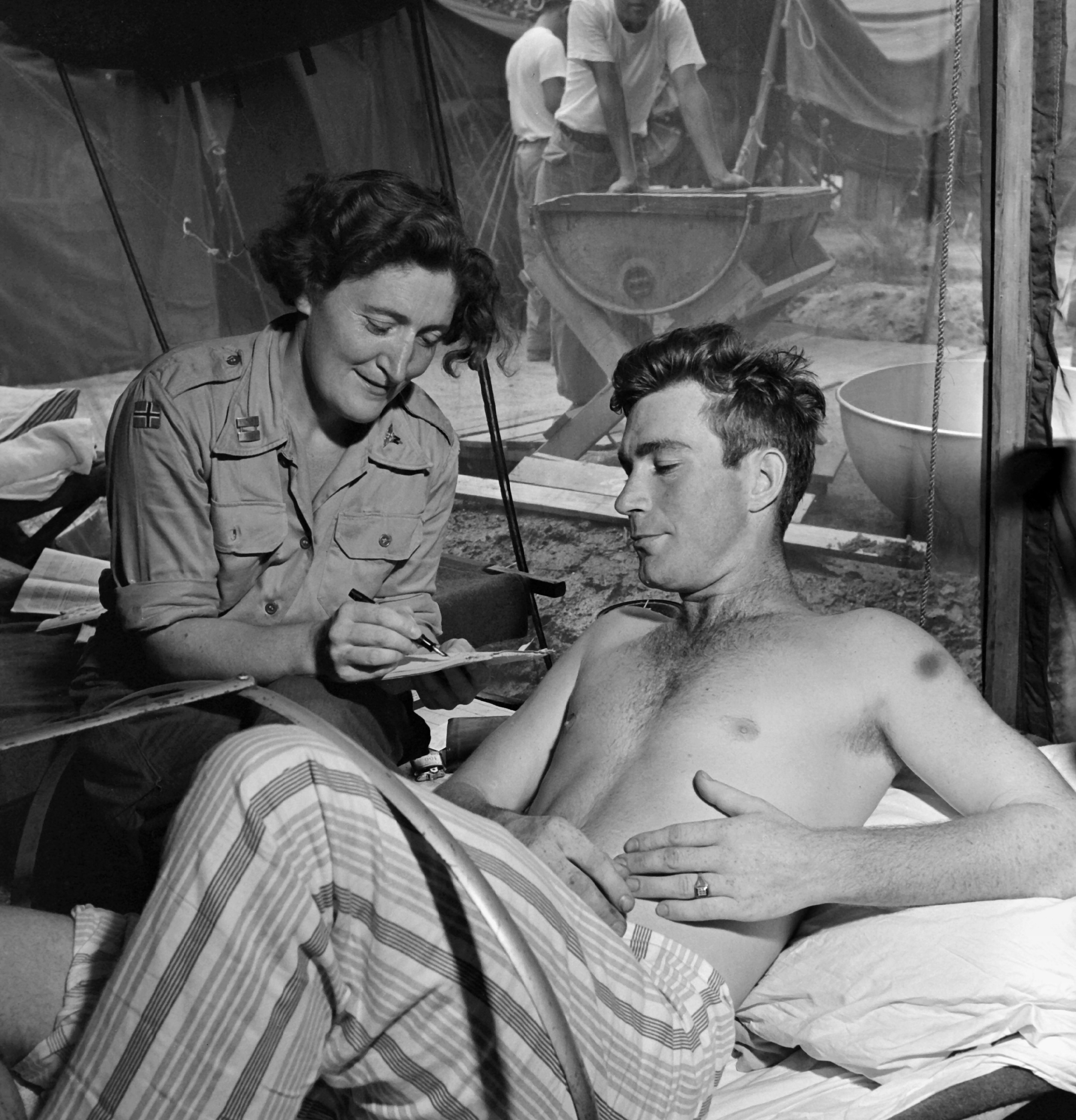
A Norwegian nurse tending to a Canadian soldier in South Korea, c. 1951

Norwegian Mobile Army Surgical Hospital (NORMASH) was the Norwegian field hospital participating in the Korean War from 1951 to 1954 under United Nations Command. On 29 December 1950, the Norwegian Red Cross received a request to establish a hospital in Korea. During the first days of 1951 a plan was drafted for a field hospital based on the American Mobile Army Surgical Hospital (MASH) with 60 beds and a staff of 83. On 2 March the Norwegian Parliament approved the plan. The first group of personnel left Norway on 16 May, and was followed by the second group on 23 May. The route from Stavanger to Tokyo ran via Munich, Nice, Naples, Beirut, Cairo, Karachi, Calcutta, Bangkok and Hong Kong. From Tokyo the personnel were transported to Seoul by military transport aircraft. They arrived in South Korea on 22 June and NORMASH was first established at Uijongbu, approximately 12 miles north of Seoul, on 19 July.

The hospital consisted of both Nissen huts and tents and had a surgery with four operating tables. The hospital was later moved to Tongduchon about 40 miles north of Seoul, and was moved a third time to its final location a few miles further north. In total, NORMASH treated 90,000 patients, of which the largest groups were the U.S. (36%), South Korea (33%) and the various British and Commonwealth troops (27%). The unit also treated 172 North Korean and Chinese POWs. NORMASH performed on average eight surgeries per day. In the fall of 1951 it was decided to increase the personnel from 83 to 105, and on 26 October the decision was made to maintain the hospital as an army hospital for the duration of the UN operation in Korea.

With the signing of the Armistice Agreement on 27 July 1953, the hospital stopped receiving wounded soldiers, but continued to treat substantial number of Korean civilians. Though an armistice was in effect, the stability in the region was questionable, and the hospital was kept at the ready in case of a breaking of the ceasefire. In the fall of 1953 NORMASH was the only hospital for four divisions in the 1st Army Corps. The hospital was kept while awaiting the establishment of a Scandinavian training hospital in Seoul, and it was not until 17 October 1954 that the hospital received orders to return to Norway. Four days later the last patient was released, and on 10 November all equipment was returned to the US Army.

In total 623 men and women served in NORMASH over seven contingents, two of which were after the Armistice. The hospital lost two personnel; driver Arne Christiansen was shot and killed in 1952, and laboratory technician Brit Reisæther was killed in a car accident in 1954. NORMASH twice received the United States Meritorious Unit Commendation and the Republic of Korea Presidential Unit Citation (6 October 1952, 23 November 1953). All personnel also received the Norwegian Korea Medal, and were visited by Marilyn Monroe.

=== Italy ===
The 68th Italian Red Cross Hospital (L’OSPEDALE Croce Rossa Italiana N°68) was an Italian field hospital in the Korean War. After the outbreak of war on 25 June 1950, Italy dispatched the medical unit to Korea to aid the humanitarian disaster, even though Italy was not a member of the United Nations until 1955.

The Italian Red Cross supported this hospital with personnel from the Military Corps (Corpo Militare della Croce Rossa Italiana) and the Volunteer Nurses Corps (Corpo delle Infermiere Volontarie della Croce Rossa Italiana). The hospital staff left Naples on 16 October, and arrived in Busan on 16 November; the hospital opened on 6 December at the Usin Elementary School facility in Yeongdeungpo District, Seoul. On 30 December 1952, a suspected communist arsonist lit a fire in the hospital, destroying it. A new hospital was built by 23 February 1953. On 30 December 1954, the hospital was transferred to the South Korean Government, and three days later the hospital staff left for Italy.

The hospital twice received the Republic of Korea Presidential Unit Citation On 2 June 1989, Graziella Simbolotti, ambassador of Italy to South Korea, installed a memorial at Usin School.

=== West Germany ===
On 7 April 1953, Chancellor of Germany Adenauer visited the United States and met President Eisenhower, where he proposed that West Germany offer medical support. Two parties of medical personnel left Germany for Korea in January and February 1954. The hospital opened on 17 May in Busan with 80 personnel and closed nearly five years later on 14 March 1959, with a total of 200 Germans having treated about 2,400,000 civilians.

President Moon Jae-in visited Germany in July 2017 where he met the surviving staff member, Karl Hauser, and the others' descendants, acknowledging their contributions; Hauser was awarded the Republic of Korea Presidential Citation. The former staff of the hospital and their descendants visited South Korea in November 2017; the South Korean Government acknowledged Germany's support in June 2018. A memorial dedicated to their service, located in Seo District, Busan, was erected in 1997.

== Memorials ==
On 20 September 1976, the Medical Support Corps Participation Monument was unveiled in Yeongdo District, Busan, commemorating the medical support provided by Sweden, India, Denmark, Norway, and Italy.

== See also ==
- United Nations Command
  - United Nations Forces in the Korean War
- United Nations Memorial Cemetery, the burial site of 2,300 United Nations Command personnel who died during the Korean War
