= United Nations Security Council Resolution 702 =

UN Security Council Resolution 702
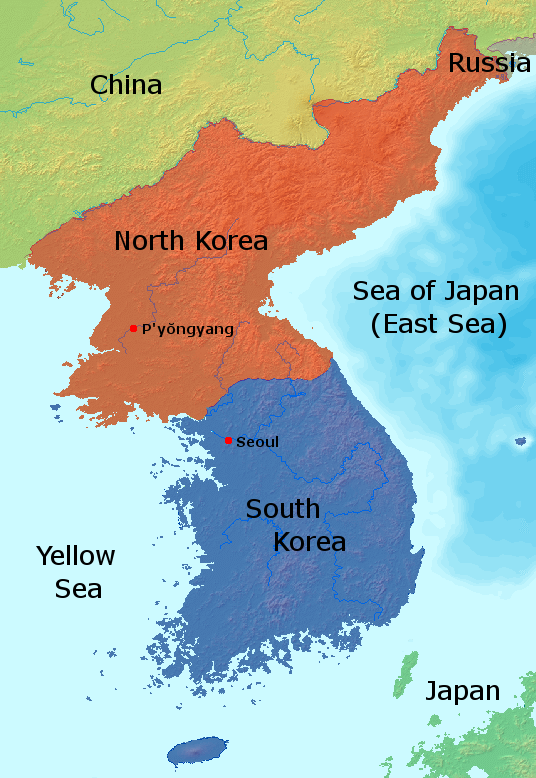
- Location of North and South Korea
- Date: 8 August 1991
- Meeting no.: 3,001
- Code: S/RES/702 (Document)
- Subject: Admission of new Members to the UN: Democratic People's Republic of Korea and Republic of Korea
- Result: Adopted without vote

Security Council composition
- Permanent members: China; France; Soviet Union; United Kingdom; United States
- Non-permanent members: Austria; Belgium; Côte d'Ivoire; Cuba; Ecuador; India; Romania; Yemen; Zaire; Zimbabwe

United Nations Security Council resolution 702, adopted without a vote on 8 August 1991, after examining separately the applications of the Democratic People's Republic of Korea (North Korea) and the Republic of Korea (South Korea) for membership in the United Nations, the Council recommended to the General Assembly that North Korea and South Korea be admitted.

On 17 September 1991, the General Assembly admitted both countries under Resolution 46/1.

== See also ==
- Member states of the United Nations
- List of United Nations Security Council Resolutions 701 to 800 (1991–1993)
- List of United Nations Security Council resolutions concerning North Korea
- Korea and the United Nations
- United Nations Security Council Resolution 335
