= John L. Pickitt =

American lieutenant general (1933–2020)

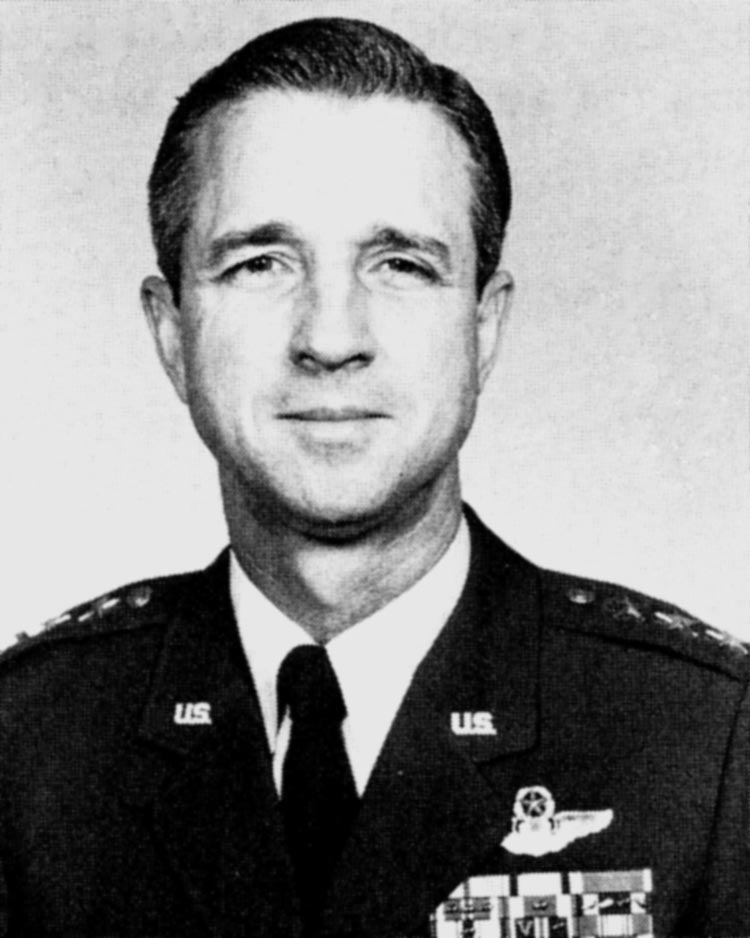
- Born: July 30, 1933; Teague, Texas U.S.
- Died: March 14, 2020 (aged 86); Charlotte, North Carolina, U.S.
- Military career
- Allegiance: United States
- Branch: United States Air Force
- Service years: 1955–1987
- Rank: Lieutenant general
- Commands: Director of Defense Nuclear Agency; deputy commander in chief, United Nations Command; chief of staff of the Republic of Korea/United States Combined Forces Command; and deputy commander, U.S. Forces Korea

John L. Pickitt (July 30, 1933 – March 14, 2020) was a lieutenant general in the United States Air Force who served as director of the Defense Nuclear Agency from 1985 to 1987. He attended the United States Military Academy. He died in 2020 in Charlotte, North Carolina.
