= Australia in the Korean War =

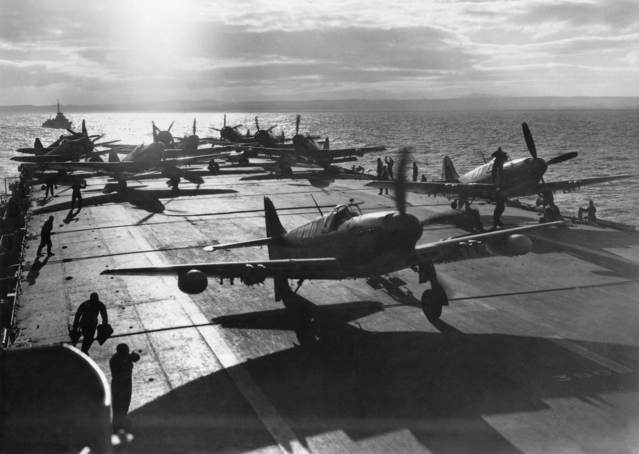
RAN Firefly aircraft on board HMAS Sydney off Korea

Australia entered the Korean War on 28 September, 1950; following the invasion of South Korea by North Korea. The war's origins began after Japan's defeat in World War II, which heralded the end to 35 years of Japanese occupation of the Korean Peninsula. The surrender of Japan to the Allied forces on 2 September 1945 led to the division of Korea into two countries, which were officially called the Democratic People's Republic of Korea (DPRK) and the Republic of Korea (ROK). The DPRK was occupied by the Soviet Union, and the ROK, below the 38th Parallel, was occupied by the United States (US).

Following failed attempts at the unification, North Korea invaded South Korea on 25 June, 1950 which caused the United Nations (UN) to call a resolution to protect South Korea from further aggression and occupation. The Liberal government of Australia, led by Prime Minister Robert Menzies, immediately responded to the resolution by offering military assistance. About 17,000 Australians served in Korea in between 1950 and 1953, with casualties numbering about 339 dead and 1200 wounded.

== Background ==
Soviet forces entered the Korean peninsula on 10 August 1945, followed a few weeks later by the American forces who entered through Incheon. US Army Lieutenant General John R. Hodge formally accepted the surrender of Japanese forces south of the 38th Parallel on 9 September 1945 at the Japanese General Government Building in Seoul. Although both rival factions had tried initially to diplomatically reunite the divided nation, it was the Northern faction that attempted to do so with military force. Troops from the Soviet backed Korean People's Army (KPA) crossed the 38th Parallel on 25 June 1950, starting a civil war. The invasion of South Korea was an unexpected action in the view of the United Nations. The same day the war had officially begun (25 June), the United Nations Security Council immediately drafted UNSC Resolution 82, which called for:

1. all hostilities to end and North Korea to withdraw to the 38th Parallel;
2. a UN Commission on Korea to be formed to monitor the situation and report to the Security Council;
3. all UN members to support the United Nations in achieving this, and refrain from providing assistance to the North Korean authorities.

With the commitment of Australian forces to the Korean War, the Australian government called for 1000 men who had prior military experience in World War II to enlist in the army for three years, with one year of overseas service in Korea, to be called Korean Force or K-Force. A portion of the force was to be recruited in Great Britain. At the end of their enlistment, personnel recruited from the United Kingdom could elect to be discharged in Australia, or to return to the UK. Their previous military experience in the Second World War would facilitate rapid deployment to Korea.

When the Korean People's Army crossed into South Korea on 25 June 1950, they advanced for Seoul, which was captured in less than a week. The lightly armed Republic of Korea Army (ROKA) put up little resistance against the KPA, whereby their forces continued south toward the strategic port of Pusan. Within two days, the United States offered its assistance and the UN Security Council asked its members to help repel the attack under the auspices of the United Nations Command, headed by the United States. Australia promptly contributed No. 77 Squadron RAAF and the 3rd Battalion, Royal Australian Regiment (3 RAR), both of which were stationed in Japan under the British Commonwealth Occupation Force (BCOF).

No. 77 Squadron converted to P-51D Mustang fighters before arriving in Japan in February 1946 to participate in the BCOF. Occupation duties proved uneventful, and No. 77 Squadron was preparing to leave Japan for Australia when the Korean War broke out and was quickly dispatched to Korea. They became the first UN air unit to enter the war, primarily in ground support, combat air patrol and escort missions. 3 RAR was rapidly committed as Australia's main land force contribution to the UN forces. After a period of intensive training and reinforcement in Japan, the battalion arrived in South Korea in late September 1950. The battalion formed part of the 27th Commonwealth Brigade and took part in the UN offensive into North Korea and the subsequent UN retreat from North Korea following the Chinese People's Volunteer Army (PVA) offensive in the winter of 1950–51. It was one of three units to receive the Presidential Unit Citation (US) after the Battle of Kapyong. In addition to combat personnel, the Australian military provided the majority of supply and support personnel to BCOF, which was superseded in 1952 by British Commonwealth Forces Korea (BCFK).

== History ==
=== Australia's involvement ===
By the time 3 RAR arrived in Pusan on 28 September, the KPA was in retreat. Under UN Supreme Commander, General Douglas MacArthur, UN forces were conducting a successful amphibious assault at Inchon and a breakout from the Pusan Perimeter on the southern tip of the Korean peninsula. A steady advance began, driving the North Koreans northwards towards the 38th Parallel. In October, the UN forces began their advance into North Korea and 3 RAR were involved in its first major action near Pyongyang.

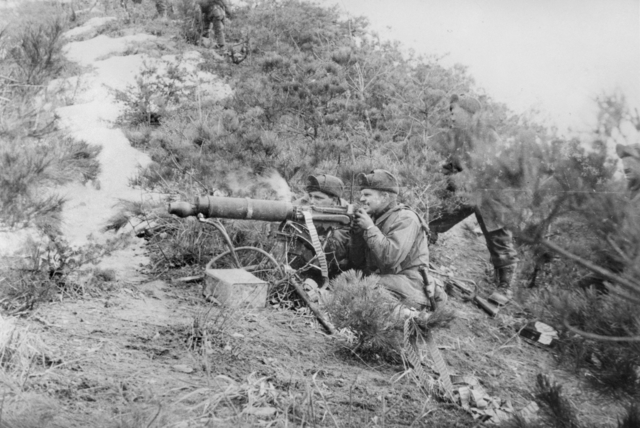
Australian soldiers firing a Vickers machine gun.

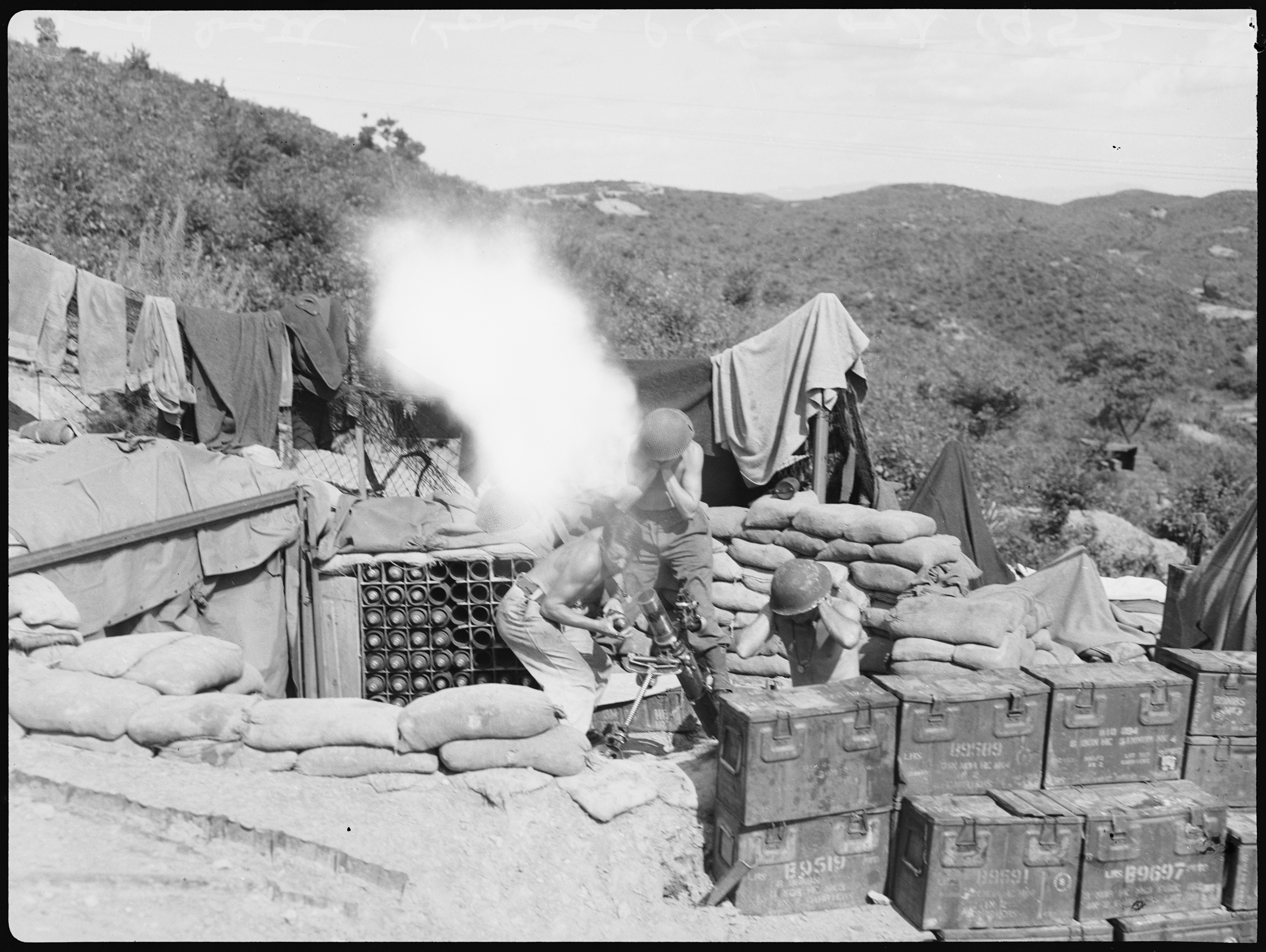
Australian mortar men, Third Battalion, Korea, 1952, by Norman Herfort

By 21 October, the US 24th Infantry Division, with the 27th British Commonwealth Brigade leading, crossed the Taedong River at Pyongyang and headed north. The next day the Australians of 3 RAR took the lead in the advance, and C Company was the leading company.

==== Battle of Yongyu ====
At 07:00 on 22 October 1950, C Company, 3 RAR advanced with 7 Platoon leading, mounted on tanks of D Company, US 89th Tank Battalion, followed by the rest of the company in motorized transport. At 09:00 and 1 mile (1.6 km) north of Yongyu, C Company came under fire from an apple orchard on the slopes of Hill 163 in YD 2354 (map grid location). It became apparent that C Company had driven into KPA which was in the process of forming up an attack on the Americans. At 09:30, 7 and 8 Platoons attacked the high ground east of the road, with 9 Platoon in reserve holding the road and northern flank.

The attacking platoons advanced uphill through the apple trees and, although outnumbered, the Australians pressed their attack. The platoons continued on to their objective, which was the vital ground. The KPA outposts were captured with comparatively little resistance, with the KPA's attention directed north around efforts to break out past the American forces. Thereafter, with the KPA's focus elsewhere, the advance by C Company was met with disorganized resistance.

The Australians reported approximately 150 KPA killed, 239 wounded, and 200 captured as a result of the action at a cost of seven wounded. The operations in Sunchon had achieved much more. The American 187 RCT claimed 3818 KPA captured, 805 killed, and 681 wounded for the loss of 46 jump casualties and 65 battle casualties. Despite heavy casualties, several hundred KPA remained in and around the battlefield. However, with the link up complete, re-deployment for the continuation of the advance commenced. Within the British Commonwealth Brigade, 1st Battalion, Middlesex Regiment passed through and assumed the lead in the drive towards the Yalu River. The Americans reassembled and drove north to rejoin their regiment which returned to Pyongyang by the other route. The Australians, along with the 1 United Kingdom Argyll and Sutherland Highlanders Regiment led by Lieutenant Colonel George Nielson, crossed the Taesong River and advanced towards Pyongyang.

==== Chinese entry ====
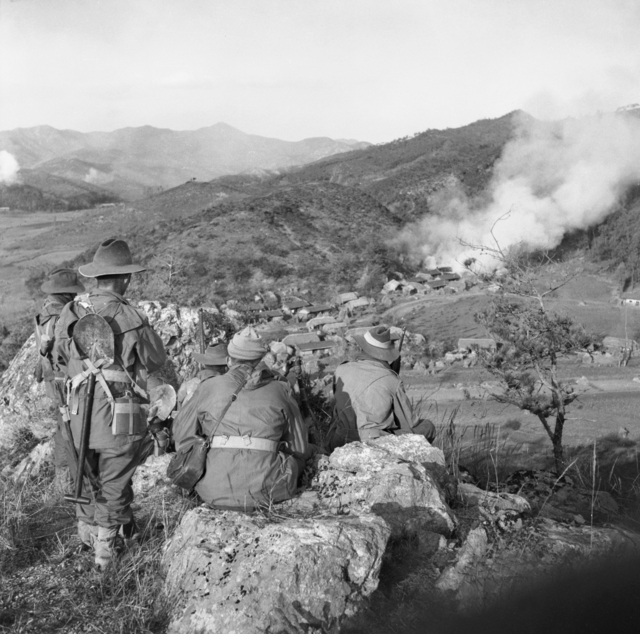
Troops from C Company, 3 RAR, watch for the enemy while a village in the valley below burns in November 1950

There were increasing concerns from the Chinese that the UN offensive would continue past the Yalu River, and cross into China. There were some deliberations in the UN forces, including General MacArthur, that war with China would be necessary and that since KPA troops were being supplied by bases in China, those supply depots should be bombed. However, US President Harry Truman and the other leaders disagreed, and MacArthur was ordered to be very cautious when approaching the Chinese border. Except on some rare occasions, UN bombers remained out of Manchuria during the war.

On 8 October 1950, the day after American troops crossed the 38th Parallel, the threat eventuated when Chairman Mao Zedong ordered the People's Liberation Army's North East Frontier Force to be reorganised into the Chinese People's Volunteer Army. He then subsequently ordered the army to move to the Yalu River. Soviet aid was requested and the intervention was delayed while waiting for the requested help from the Soviets, with the planned attack postponed from 13 to 19 October. However, Soviet assistance was limited to providing air support no nearer than 60 miles (97 km) from the battlefront.

The PVA first engaged UN troops on 25 October 1950, with 270,000 PVA troops under the command of General Peng Dehuai, in the Battles of Onjong, Unsan and Pakchon. Following their initial intervention the PVA withdrew, with the UN offensive renewed on 24 November in what was called the Home-by-Christmas Offensive. This triggered PVA to begin another offensive, called the Second Phase Offensive, which pushed the UN forces back in the west while in the east the UN forces were defeated at Chosin Reservoir. The UN forces began a retreat from North Korea and by the end of the year held a line north of Seoul. On the east coast UN forces were evacuated by sea from Hungnam. The PVA launched their third Offensive on 31 December, pushing back the UN forces and recapturing Seoul on 4 January. The UN began a series of counteroffensives beginning with Operation Thunderbolt on 25 January, recaptured Seoul on 16 March in Operation Ripper and advancing the UN lines north of the 38th Parallel in Operation Rugged and Operation Dauntless.

The PVA began a new Spring Offensive in April 1951 as the weather improved, also referred to as the Fifth Phase Offensive, with the intention of recapturing Seoul. The PVA launched a major assault between 22 and 25 April that resulted in a victory in the Battle of the Imjin River. At the same time, the UN repelled PVA forces at Kapyong.

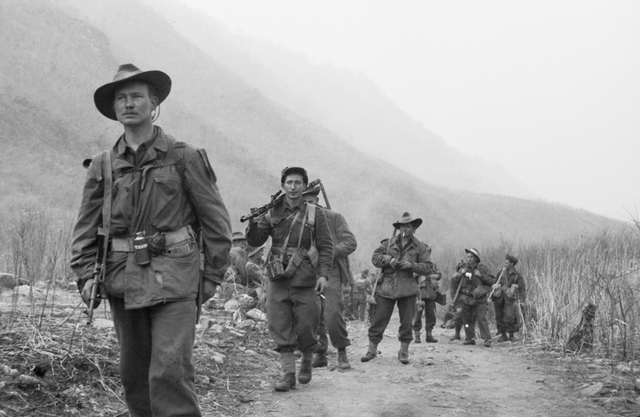
Members of 3 RAR move forward in 1951

==== Battle of Kapyong ====
PVA forces of the 118th Division attacked the Kapyong Valley, and pushed ROK and New Zealand troops into retreat. Under heavy pressure, the ROKA 6th Division broke, and the line collapsed. ROKA soldiers poured through a gap under protective covering fire from Australians who were holding their section of the line despite heavy pressure.

Chinese soldiers captured by Australians, 24 April 1951.

Australian troops from 3 RAR, and Canadian troops from Princess Patricia's Canadian Light Infantry were ordered to halt this PVA advance. The mission of the men of the 27th British Commonwealth Brigade was to block the two approaches to Kapyong. In only a few hours, they managed to prepare defensive positions.

The PVA 118th Division engaged their two forward battalions on 23 April. In the early part of the battle the 1st Battalion of the Middlesex Regiment and the 16th Field Regiment of the Royal New Zealand Artillery were almost cut off. The resistance of forward positions, held by the 2nd Battalion, Princess Patricia's Canadian Light Infantry (2 PPCLI), and 3 RAR, permitted the 1st Battalion, Middlesex Regiment to withdraw. It moved into place to provide a reserve.

The initial PVA attack at Kapyong engaged 3 RAR on Hill 504. The PVA then struck at the Canadian front. Continued assaults by PVA troops kept up the attack throughout the night of 23 April. After a night of fierce fighting, Major Bernard O'Dowd who was Officer Commanding of A Company, 3 RAR, managed to get through on a radio phone to a general of the 1st Marine Division. The response given was that the attacking unit no longer existed, and that it had been wiped out the night before. The PVA managed to infiltrate the brigade position by the morning of 23 April. The Australians and Canadians were facing the whole of the PVA 118th Division. The fighting eventually devolved, on both fronts, into hand-to-hand combat with bayonet charges. The Australians, facing encirclement, were ordered to make an orderly fall back to new defensive positions late in the day of 24 April.

2 PPCLI was completely surrounded. Captain Mills, in command of D Company, 2 PPCLI, was forced to call down artillery fire on his own positions on Hill 677 several times during the early morning hours of 25 April to avoid being overrun. It had to be resupplied by air drops during this desperate time. By dawn the PVA attack on the Canadian position had abated, and in the afternoon of 25 April the road through to the Canadians had been cleared of PVA, at which time the 2nd Battalion was relieved. The 16th Field Regiment, Royal New Zealand Artillery, also managed to withdraw and link up with the US Army's 72nd Heavy Tank Battalion. These units provided close heavy gun support.

During the withdrawal of the Australians, 4 men from B Company, 3RAR, formed a rearguard to hold off any flanking attacks. The four Australians held off three waves of PVA soldiers, killing at least 25 and wounding many more. After two days and two nights of fighting, the Australians had recaptured their positions, at the cost of 32 men killed and 53 wounded. For this contribution of stalling the PVA advance, 3 RAR received a United States Distinguished Unit Citation.

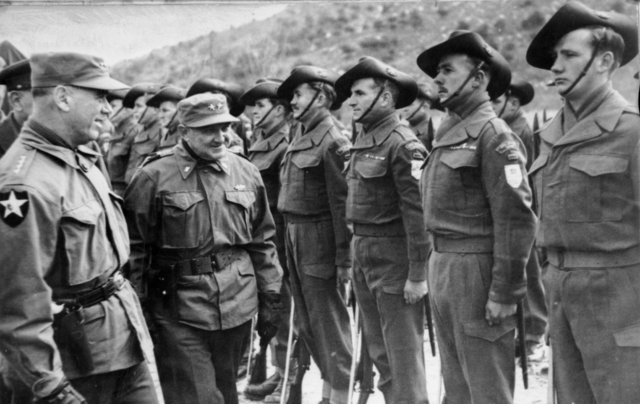
US General James Van Fleet inspects members of 3 RAR after awarding a Presidential Unit Citation to the Battalion in December 1952

Despite their enormous advantage in numbers the PVA troops had been badly outgunned. Their courage and tenacity could not overcome the well-trained, well-disciplined and well-armed Australians and Canadians.

For their conduct of this engagement, Lieutenant-Colonel Bruce Ferguson of Australia, and Lieutenant-Colonel James R. Stone of Canada were each awarded the Distinguished Service Order. For Stone, it was the second bar to the DSO he had first won during Operation Olive in Italy in 1944.

==== Battle of Maryang San (Operation Commando) ====
The second major battle the Australians fought in 1951 was Operation Commando. Operation Commando was the last major UN offensive thrust of the Korean War. It was an attack on a PVA salient in a bend of the Imjin River, designed to prevent the PVA/KPA from interdicting the UN supply lines near Seoul.

By July 1951, 3 RAR had come under the control of the 1st Commonwealth Division. Objectives of the 1st Commonwealth Division during Operation Commando, including the Australians, were Hill 355 and Hill 317.

The attack began on 3 October 1951 with the US I Corps (including four US Divisions, the 1st Commonwealth Division and the ROKA 1st Division) seizing the Jamestown Line destroying elements of the PVA 42nd Army, 47th Army, 64th Army and 65th Army, and after five days of intense combat, eventually forcing the PVA into retreat. The operation was a success, and ended on 15 October, with a few hills south of the line still in PVA/KPA hands, requiring a follow-up operation (Operation Polecharge).

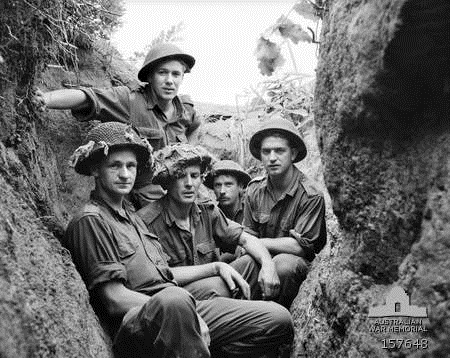
Men from the Royal Australian Regiment, June 1953.

The official historian for the Korean War, Robert O'Neill, wrote of this battle: "In this action 3RAR had won one of the most impressive victories achieved by any Australian battalion. In five days of heavy fighting 3RAR dislodged a numerically superior enemy from a position of great strength. The Australians were successful in achieving surprise on 3 and 5 October, the company and platoon showed high courage, tenacity and morale despite some very difficult situations, such as that of D company when the mist rose on 5 October and those of B and C Companies when the weight of enemy fire threatened their isolation of Hill 317 on 7 October ... The victory of Maryang San is probably the greatest single feat of the Australian Army during the Korean War".

Australian casualties during Operation Commando were 20 dead and 89 wounded.

==== Digging in ====
After 1951, both sides were in a type of combat comparable to the Western Front in World War I in which men lived in tunnels, redoubts, and sandbagged forts behind barbed wire fortifications. From 1951 to the end of the war, 3 RAR held trenches on the eastern side of the Commonwealth Division's positions in the hills northeast of the Imjin River. Across from them were heavily fortified PVA positions.

As the war continued, several other nations grew less willing to contribute more ground troops. Australia, however, increased its troop strength in Korea, by sending 1 RAR. This battalion arrived in Korea on 6 April 1952 and experienced its first major combat during Operation Blaze on 2 July. In March 1953, they were replaced by 2 RAR.

=== RAN in Korea ===
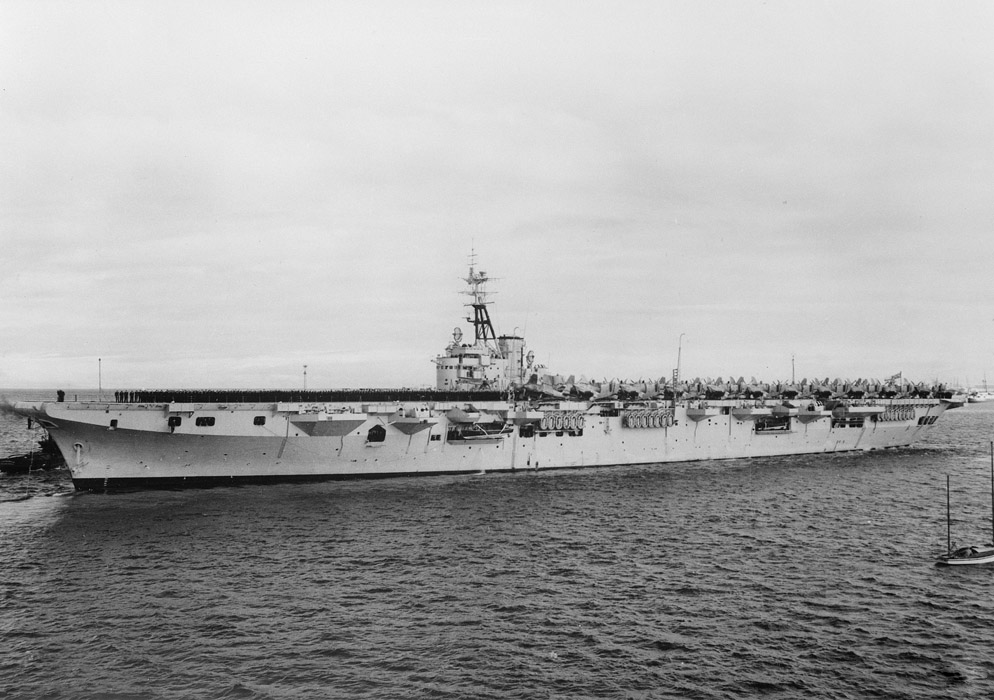
HMAS Sydney, which served off Korea during 1951

Royal Australian Navy vessels had been stationed in Japan following the Japanese surrender ending World War II. Following North Korea's invasion of the South, RAN vessels stationed in Japan were put on immediate alert.

On 29 June Prime Minister Robert Menzies announced that the frigate HMAS Shoalhaven, stationed in Japan, and the destroyer HMAS Bataan, in Hong Kong would be placed under UN command in Korea. On 1 July, one day after President Truman committed American ground forces to Korea, the first Australian operation in Korea took place; HMAS Shoalhaven moved from Japan to Pusan escorting an American ammunition ship. On 27 July 1950, the destroyer HMAS Warramunga was also deployed.

During the landing at Wonsan on 26 October 1950, HMAS Warramunga provided gunfire support during the landing of US X Corps, however the landing was unopposed as ROK forces had already captured the area on 11 October. During the mass evacuation of troops and refugees in the city of Hungnam in December 1950, HMA Ships Bataan and Warramunga assisted in the evacuation. In October 1951, HMAS Sydney arrived in Korean waters to replace HMS Glory for a three-month tour. Sydney carried two squadrons of Sea Furies – 805 Squadron RAN and 808 Squadron RAN, and 817 Squadron RAN equipped with Fireflies. Sydney returned to Japan having lost only 9 aircraft, with 3 pilots killed, and having launched over 2,700 missions from her flight deck. Later in the war, 9 ships of the RAN participated in the naval blockade of North Korea.

=== RAAF in Korea ===
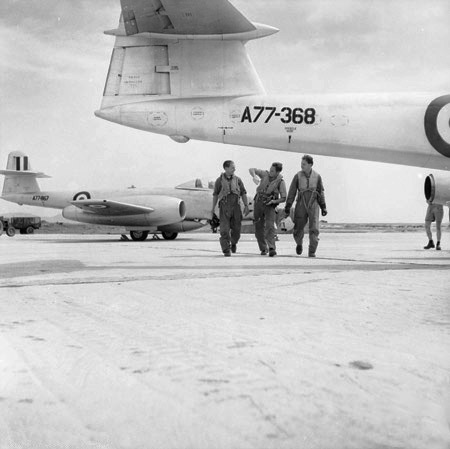
No. 77 Squadron pilots and Meteor aircraft in Korea

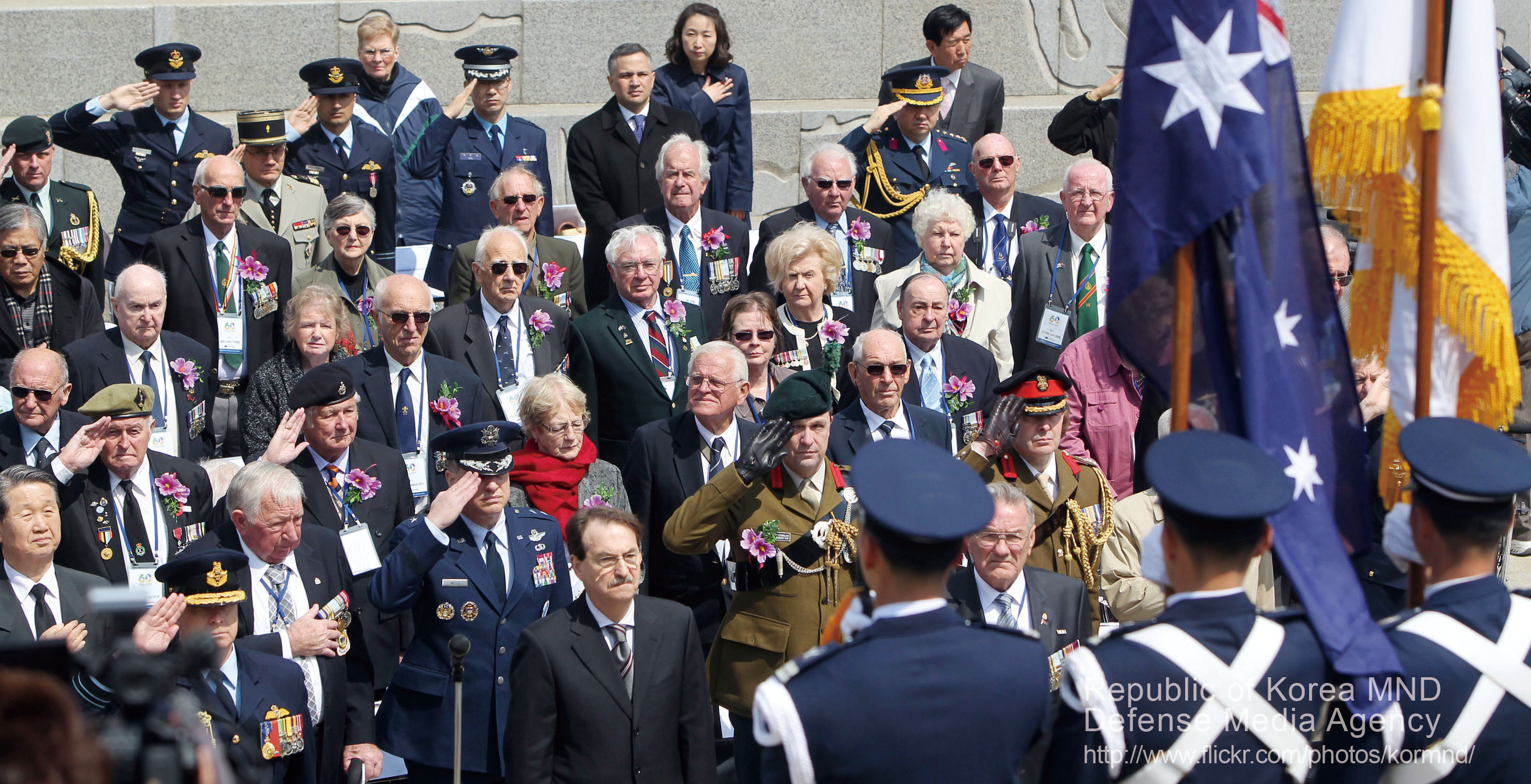
RAAF veterans of the Korean War participated a ceremony in Seoul, 2012.

The Royal Australian Air Force was heavily involved in the Pacific War during World War II. Following the Japanese surrender, No. 77 Squadron was selected as part of Australia's contribution to the British Commonwealth Occupation Force and, after converting to P-51D Mustang fighters, arrived in Japan in February 1946. Occupation duties proved uneventful, and No. 77 Squadron was preparing to leave Japan for Australia when the Korean War broke out in June 1950.

No. 77 Squadron was committed to action over Korea as part of the UN forces, and flew its first ground attack sorties on 2 July 1950, making it the first UN unit to see action.

No. 30 Communications Flight, No. 491 (Maintenance) Squadron, and No. 391 (Base) Squadron were attached to the UN Command in Korea and grouped into No. 91 (Composite) Wing in October 1950. No. 91 Wing was based in Iwakuni, Japan.

No. 77 Squadron fully deployed to Korea in October to support the UN advance into North Korea but was withdrawn to Pusan in November in response to the PVA counter-attack.

The Squadron was withdrawn to Japan in April 1951 to re-equip with Gloster Meteor jet fighters and returned to action with these new aircraft in July, where they met with greater success against the Soviet MiG-15 pilots. However, the MiGs were still far superior to the Meteor.

Following heavy losses from MiG-15 fighters, No. 77 Squadron operated in the ground attack role from December 1951 until the end of the war; it remained in South Korea on garrison duties until returning to Australia in November 1954.

==== Battle of Sunchon ====
The Battle of Sunchon was an air battle fought near the city of Sunchon on 1 December 1951, 12 Gloster Meteor jets of the RAAF's No. 77 Squadron were attacked by 40–50 Chinese MiG-15s. Despite their Meteors having inferior maneuverability to the Soviet-built MiGs, the Australian pilots managed to score their first victories of the Korean War, for the loss of three aircraft. Accounts vary, with the Australians claiming at least 10 MiGs shot down, but Chinese and North Korean sources stated it was only one.

==== Airfields used ====
- Taegu
- Pohang 10/50 11/50
- Yonpo Airfield, North Korea 11/50 12/50
- Pusan East (K-9) Air Base 12/50 04/51
- Kimpo 7/51 03/54
- Kunsan 3/54 10/54

=== Cessation of hostilities ===
On 29 November 1952, US President-elect Dwight D. Eisenhower fulfilled a campaign promise by going to Korea to find out what could be done to end the conflict. The Korean Armistice Agreement was signed on 27 July 1953, by the UN, North Korea, and China, President of South Korea Syngman Rhee refused to sign the agreement. When the Armistice Agreement was signed and the ceasefire came into effect the front line was back on approximately the 38th Parallel. Under the terms of the armistice a demilitarised zone (DMZ) was established along the front line, presently defended by North Korean troops on one side and by South Korean, American, and UN troops on the other. The DMZ runs north of the parallel towards the east, and to the south as it travels west.

After the war ended, Australians remained in Korea for four years as military observers. Australia gained political and security benefits, the most important being the signing of the ANZUS Treaty with the United States and New Zealand.

Of the 17,000 Australians who served in Korea, casualties numbered more than 1,500, of whom 339 were killed.

== Timeline of Australian involvement in Korea ==
1950	25 June 1950 – Korean People's Army crosses 38th Parallel, invading South Korea.; 25 June 1950 – United Nations drafts UNSC Resolution 82 calling for cessation of hostilities, and withdrawal of North Korean forces. Australia endorses resolution and offers military assistance.; 29 June 1950 – RAN frigate HMAS Shoalhaven and destroyer HMAS Bataan, are dispatched to Korea.; 2 July 1950 – RAAF P-51D Mustangs begin their first ground attack sorties in Korea.; 28 September 1950 – 3rd Battalion, Royal Australian Regiment arrive in Pusan, South Korea to provide Australia's main land force contribution, and is attached to the 27th British Commonwealth Brigade.; 26 October 1950 – During the landing at Wonsan HMAS Warramunga provided gunfire support during the landing of US X Corps.; October 1950 – UN Forces drive the KPA back beyond the 38th Parallel, and continue to pursue them.; 19 October 1950 – UN Forces capture Pyongyang.; 19 October 1950 – Chinese forces enter North Korea, joining the war on North Korea's side.; 25 October 1950 – First engagement between UN and Chinese forces.; 5 November 1950 – Battle of Pakchon involving 3RAR is fought, resulting in a UN victory.; 2 – 24 December 1950 – UN Forces retreat from North Korea
1951	April 1951 – No. 77 Squadron RAAF is withdrawn to Japan to be refitted with Gloster Meteor jet fighters.; 22–25 April 1951 – Battle of Kapyong involving 3RAR is fought, resulting in a decisive UN victory.; July 1951 – No. 77 Squadron RAAF returns to air combat duties in Korea with Meteor jet fighters.; July 1951 – Commonwealth forces in Korea form the 1st Commonwealth Division.; October 1951 – Aircraft carrier HMAS Sydney arrives in Korean waters where she will launch over 2,700 sorties over Korea, losing 9 aircraft with 3 pilots killed.; October 1951 – First Battle of Maryang-san involving 3RAR is fought, resulting in UN victory.; December 1951 – Meteors from No. 77 Squadron RAAF are involved in heavy dogfighting during the Battle of Sunchon, claiming between 1–10 enemy, and losing 3 Meteors.; December 1951 – No. 77 Squadron RAAF is withdrawn from air combat duties, unable to compete with better performing Soviet MiG-15 jets.
1952	March 1952 – 1st Battalion, Royal Australian Regiment (1RAR) arrives in Korea, boosting Australia's troop commitment.; July 1952 – British Commonwealth Forces Korea supersedes the British Commonwealth Occupation Force.
1953	March 1953 – 1RAR's 12-month tour ends, replaced by 2nd Battalion, Royal Australian Regiment (2RAR).; 24–26 July 1953 – 2RAR and 3RAR hold off a concerted Chinese attack against the Hook during the Battle of the Samichon River.; 27 July 1953 – Korean Armistice Agreement is signed, ending hostilities in the Korean War.; 5 August 1953 – Operation Big Switch began, 21 Australian POWs returned.

== See also ==
- Australia in the Korean War 1950–53, a history book
- Australian Army battle honours of the Korean War
- United Kingdom in the Korean War
- Canada in the Korean War
- New Zealand in the Korean War
- Korean War Memorial
- United Nations Forces in the Korean War
- Medical support in the Korean War
