= Operation Minden =

UN offensive during the Korean War

Coordinates: 38°19′N 127°14′E

- Part of the Korean War
Date	8–12 September 1951
Location	Imjin River, Korea
Result	United Nations victory

Belligerents
United Nations: United Kingdom; Canada; Australia	China

Commanders and leaders
(United Kingdom) James Cassels	Unknown

Units involved
(United Kingdom) 1st Commonwealth Division: (Canada) 25th Brigade; (United Kingdom) 28th Brigade; (United Kingdom) 29th Brigade	Unknown

Strength
Three brigades	Unknown

Casualties and losses
~15 killed	Unknown

Operation Minden was an offensive undertaken by United Nations Command (UN) forces during the Korean War between 8–12 September 1951, as part of a general advance to extend the Wyoming Line, the UN Main line of resistance. Operation Minden was the precursor to the much larger Operation Commando, which established the Jamestown Line.

== Background ==
By the autumn of 1951, US I Corps were positioned along the Wyoming Line, which was north of the 38th Parallel. The Wyoming Line served as an outpost line, and was an extension of the Kansas Line. The Wyoming Line ran roughly in an northeasterly arc from Hwachon Reservoir to the west of Chorwon. However, the curvature of the Imjin River, north of the small town of Choksong, meant that there was a salient extending southwards into the line.

As part of an overall strategy to seize territory in order to strengthen his army's defensive position US Eighth Army commander General James Van Fleet, ordered the removal of this salient in an operation codenamed "Minden". The operation would primarily involve three elements of the 1st British Commonwealth Division, commanded by General James Cassels; the 28th British Commonwealth Brigade, the 29th British Commonwealth Brigade and the 25th Canadian Infantry Brigade.

== Operation ==
The 28th British Commonwealth Brigade, including the 1st Battalions of the King's Shropshire Light Infantry and King's Own Scottish Borderers as well as 3rd Battalion, Royal Australian Regiment (3RAR), crossed the Imjin River and established a bridgehead on 8 September. Corresponding moves were made by flanking South Korean and United States units.

The initial movement of the 28th Brigade was met with little resistance, with the exception of some minor skirmishing on the 3RAR front, during which three prisoners were captured. With the bridgehead secure, two bridges were quickly erected by I Corps engineers, with one bridge situated at the river crossing of the northerly road from Choksong.

The 29th Infantry Brigade and the 25th Canadian Infantry Brigade moved out of the bridgehead on 11 September. The 29th advanced to the northwest, while the Canadians moved off to the north. The 28th Brigade remained in reserve, guarding the newly constructed bridge. Like the 8 September crossing of the Imjin River, the movement of the 29th Brigade met with little resistance, although there were light casualties (12 killed) due to artillery fire. The Canadians completed their movements with no casualties. The operation concluded on 12 September, with the front line now running across the arc of the Imjin River, and firmly established nearly five kilometres north of the river.

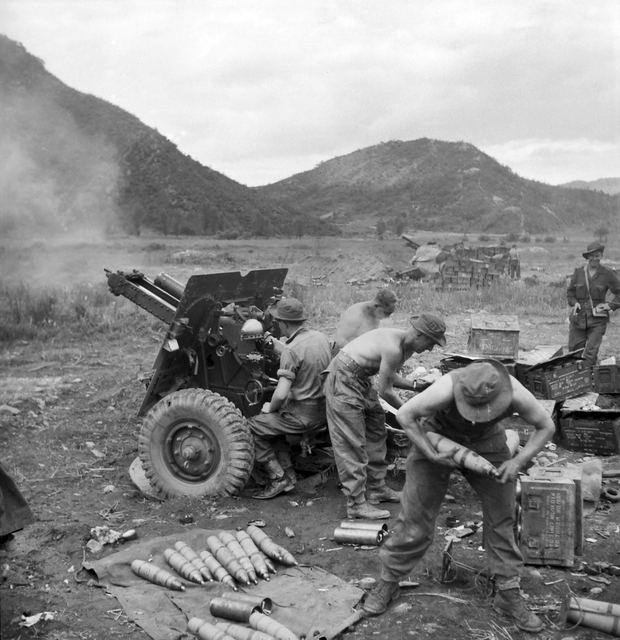
New Zealand artillery firing in support of the 3rd Battalion, Royal Australian Regiment

== Aftermath ==
There was some further adjustment of the line which was not completed until 14 September. As part of this adjustment, B Company, of the 2nd Battalion of the Royal 22^{e} Régiment, mounted offensive operations in order to seize some hills held by the Chinese, during which three Canadian soldiers were killed and ten wounded. The new front line was now much closer to the Chinese outposts than previously, necessitating regular patrols. Around 1,500 civilians also had to be evacuated from the area.

The successful implementation of Operation Minden led to the more large scale Operation Commando, which involved a substantial part of I Corps. Operation Commando was launched in October 1951 and resulted in the establishment of the Jamestown Line.
