= Yang Guoping =

General in the People's Armed Police of China

- 杨国屏

Commander of the People's Armed Police
- In office February 1996 – December 1999
- Preceded by: Ba Zhongtan
- Succeeded by: Wu Shuangzhan

Chief of Staff of the Jinan Military Region
- In office April 1990 – December 1993
- Commander: Zhang Wannian; Zhang Taiheng
- Preceded by: Ma Weizhi
- Succeeded by: Qian Guoliang

Personal details
- Born: October 1934 (age 91–92) Zhongxiang County, Hubei, China
- Party: Chinese Communist Party
- Education: PLA Military Academy

Military service
- Allegiance: People's Republic of China
- Branch/service: People's Liberation Army Ground Force (1950–1996); People's Armed Police (1996–1998)
- Years of service: 1950–1999
- Rank: General
- Unit: 64th Group Army
- Commands: Shenyang Military Region; Jinan Military Region

Chinese name
- Simplified Chinese: 杨国屏
- Traditional Chinese: 楊國屏
Transcriptions
Standard Mandarin
- Hanyu Pinyin: Yáng Guópíng

Yang Guoping (Chinese: 杨国屏; born October 1934) is a general in the People's Armed Police of China who served as its commander from 1996 to 1999. He was a member of the 15th Central Committee of the Chinese Communist Party.

== Biography ==
Yang was born in Zhongxiang County (now Zhongxiang), Hubei, in October 1934. He enlisted in the People's Liberation Army (PLA) in March 1950, and joined the Chinese Communist Party (CCP) in March 1956. He became a surveyor in the Northeast China Military District (reshuffled as Shenyang Military Region in 1955) in October 1951, and was promoted to head of Operational Division of Command Department in December 1980. He was chief of staff of the 64th Group Army in May 1983 and deputy chief of staff of the Shenyang Military Region in August 1985. He was promoted to chief of staff of the Jinan Military Region in April 1990. In December 1993, he was promoted again to become its deputy commander. He was appointed vice president of the PLA National Defence University in December 1994, and served until February 1996, when he was named commander of the People's Armed Police. His predecessor Ba Zhongtan resigned due to the murder of Li Peiyao, vice chairperson of the Standing Committee of the National People's Congress.

He was promoted to the rank of major general (shaojiang) in 1988, lieutenant general (zhongjiang) in 1993, and general (shangjiang) in 1998.

Military offices
Preceded by Ma Weizhi	Chief of Staff of the Jinan Military Region; 1990–1993	Succeeded by Qian Guoliang
Preceded by Ba Zhongtan	Commander of the People's Armed Police; 1996–1999	Succeeded by Wu Shuangzhan
