= Qian Guoliang =

Chinese military officer (1940–2023)

- 钱国梁

Commander of Shenyang Military Region
- In office December 1999 – December 2004
- Preceded by: Liang Guanglie
- Succeeded by: Chang Wanquan

Commander of Jinan Military Region
- In office December 1993 – November 1996
- Preceded by: Zhang Taiheng
- Succeeded by: Chen Bingde

Chief of Staff Jinan Military Region
- In office December 1993 – November 1996
- Preceded by: Yang Guoping
- Succeeded by: Shen Zhaoji

Personal details
- Born: January 1940 Wujiang County, Jiangsu, China
- Died: 15 February 2023 (aged 83) Nanjing, Jiangsu, China
- Party: Chinese Communist Party
- Education: PLA Military Academy; PLA National Defence University

Military service
- Allegiance: People's Republic of China
- Branch/service: People's Liberation Army Ground Force
- Years of service: 1958–2004
- Rank: General
- Battles/wars: Sino-Vietnamese War

Chinese name
- Simplified Chinese: 钱国梁
- Traditional Chinese: 錢國樑
Transcriptions
Standard Mandarin
- Hanyu Pinyin: Qián Guóliáng

Qian Guoliang (Chinese: 钱国梁; January 1940 – 15 February 2023) was a Chinese general (shangjiang) of the People's Liberation Army (PLA), an alternate member of the 13th and 14th Central Committee of the Chinese Communist Party, and a member of the 15th and 16th Central Committee of the Chinese Communist Party.

== Biography ==
Qian was born in Wujiang County (now Wujiang District of Suzhou), Jiangsu in 1940. He enlisted in the People's Liberation Army (PLA) in December 1958 and joined the Chinese Communist Party (CCP) in December 1960. He graduated from the PLA Military Academy and PLA National Defence University. In 1979, he participated in the Sino-Vietnamese War. In 1983, Qian rose to become chief of staff of the 27th Group Army and was then promoted again to the position of commander in July 1985. In December 1993, he became chief of staff of Jinan Military Region, rising to commander in November 1996. He became commander of Shenyang Military Region in December 1999, serving in the post until his retirement in December 2004.

Qian was promoted to the rank of major general (shaojiang) in September 1988, lieutenant general (zhongjiang) in July 1995 and general (shangjiang) in June 2002.

Qian died in Nanjing, Jiangsu on 15 February 2023, at the age of 83.

Military offices
New title	Commander of the 27th Group Army; 1985–1989	Succeeded by Huang Xinsheng
Preceded by Yang Guoping	Chief of Staff Jinan Military Region; 1993–1996	Succeeded by Shen Zhaoji
Preceded by Zhang Taiheng	Commander of Jinan Military Region; 1993–1996	Succeeded by Chen Bingde
Preceded by Liang Guanglie	Commander of Shenyang Military Region; 1999–2004	Succeeded by Chang Wanquan
