= Operation Polecharge =

UN offensive during the Korean War

Coordinates: 38°00′N 126°49′E

- Part of the Korean War
Date	15–19 October 1951
Location	Around the 38th Parallel
Result	United Nations victory

Belligerents
United Nations: United States; Belgium	China

Units involved
(United States) I Corps: (United States) Fifth Cavalry Regiment; (United States) Eighth Cavalry Regiment; (Belgium) Belgian Battalion	(China) Unknown

Casualties and losses
~2,900	US Claim: ~16,000

Operation Polecharge was an offensive undertaken by United Nations Command (UN) forces during the Korean War between 15–19 October 1951, following on from the successful Operation Commando which established the Jamestown Line.

== Background ==
Operation Commando involved five UN divisions of US I Corps; the US 1st Cavalry Division, the US 3rd, US 25th Infantry Division, the Republic of Korea Army (ROK) 1st Division and the 1st Commonwealth Division. The operation was intended to form a line of defense just north of the 38th Parallel and ended on 15 October 1951, having successfully established the Jamestown Line. However, a few hills south of the line remained in the hands of the Chinese People's Volunteer Army (PVA) and threatened supply lines to Seoul. Operation Polecharge was intended to seize control of these high positions.

== Operation ==
The 5th Cavalry Regiment of the 1st Cavalry Division, together with the Belgian Battalion attached to the 3rd Infantry Division, was tasked with the capture of Hills 346, 272 and 230. The 8th Cavalry Regiment would provide support if required.

The operation began on 15 October with the seizure of Hill 346 by the 5th Cavalry. On 18 October Hill 230 was captured after initial attacks, supported by the 8th Cavalry, were strongly rebuffed. Hill 272 was also strongly defended by the PVA but fell to UN forces on 19 October, marking the successful conclusion of Operation Polecharge.

During Operations Commando and Polecharge, the UN forces inflicted heavy losses on the PVA, in the order of 16,000 men, and forced the PVA to retreat north to their next line of defence, Yokkok-chon. The 1st Cavalry Division had suffered 2,900 casualties, including losses incurred during Operation Commando, and was withdrawn to Japan the following month.

== Aftermath ==
Operation Polecharge saw the Jamestown Line secure as well as the elimination of the threat posed by the PVA to the UN's supply lines to Seoul. The conclusion of Operations Commando and Polecharge also marked the beginning of the static phase of the Korean War as well as the resumption of armistice negotiations at Panmunjom.
