= Chang Wanquan =

Minister of Defence and State Councilor of the People's Republic of China

General Chang Wanquan
- 常万全
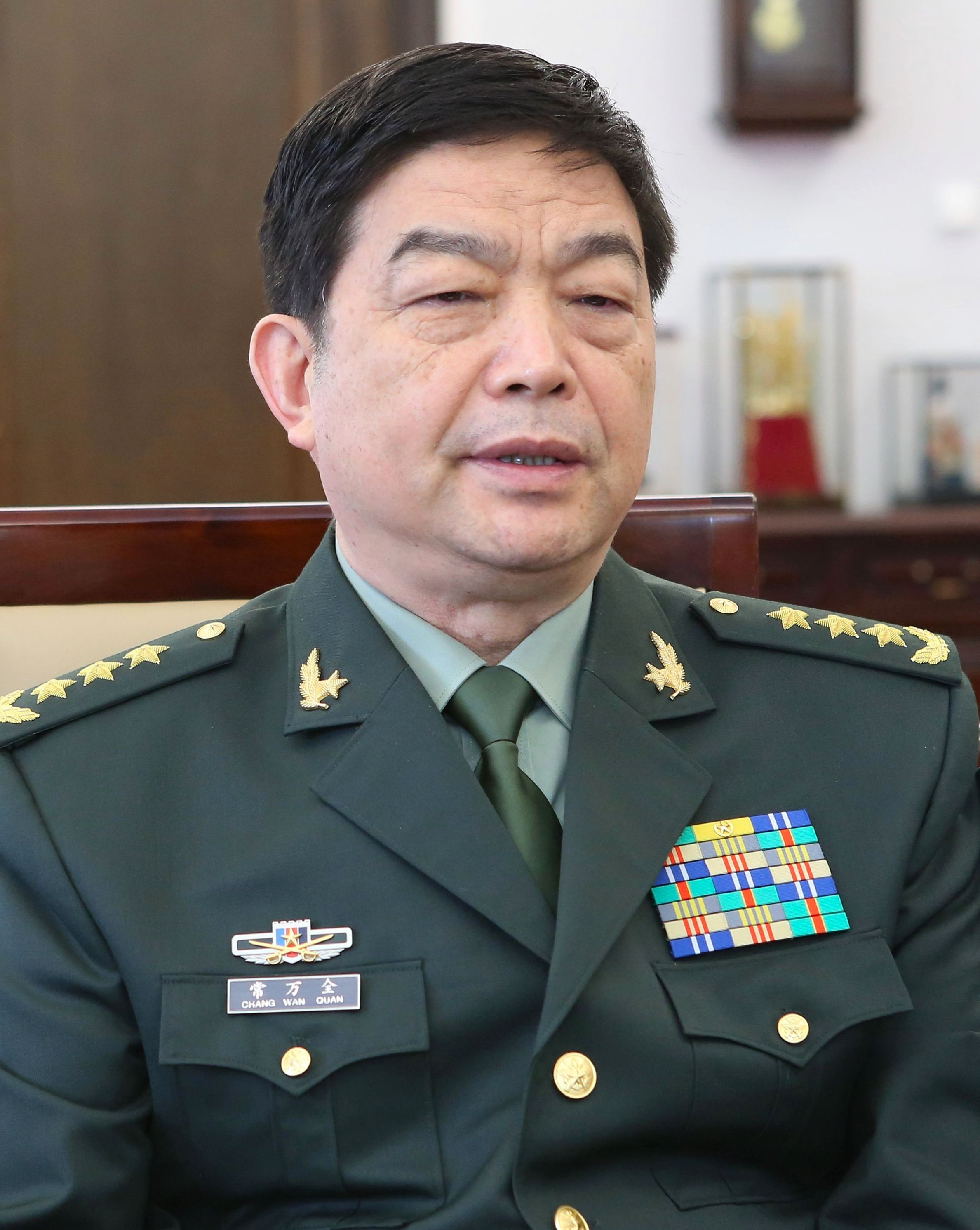

State Councilor of China
- In office 16 March 2013 – 19 March 2018
- Premier: Li Keqiang

11th Minister of National Defense
- In office 16 March 2013 – 19 March 2018
- Premier: Li Keqiang
- Preceded by: Liang Guanglie
- Succeeded by: Wei Fenghe

Personal details
- Born: January 1949 (age 77) Nanyang, Henan, China
- Party: Chinese Communist Party

Military service
- Allegiance: People's Republic of China
- Branch/service: People's Liberation Army Ground Force
- Years of service: 1968–2018
- Rank: General
- Commands: Ministry of National Defense (2003–2008); PLA General Armaments Department (2007–2012); Shenyang Military Region (2004–2007); 47th Group Army (2000–2002)

Chang Wanquan (Chinese: 常万全; born January 1949) is a retired Chinese general who was the Minister of National Defense and State Councilor of China from 2013 and 2018. He was also a member of the Central Military Commission and helped to manage China's space program.

== Life and career ==
Born in Nanyang, Henan Province, in 1949, Chang joined the PLA in March 1968 and the Chinese Communist Party (CCP) in November of the same year. From January 2002 to December 2004, he was the chief of staff and a CCP committee member of the Lanzhou Military Region. From December 2004 to September 2007, he was the commander of the Shenyang Military Region. He was also director of the PLA General Armaments Department. In October 2007 he was elected as a member of the Central Military Commission.

He attained the rank of senior colonel in 1992, major general in July 1997, lieutenant general in 2003, and full general in October 2007. He has been a member of the 16th, 17th and 18th Central Committee's.

In October 2012, he was appointed as a member of the Central Military Commission (CMC).

At the first plenary session of the 12th National People's Congress in October 2013, he was appointed Minister of National Defense, succeeding General Liang Guanglie. He was also appointed as State Councilor.

Military offices
Preceded by Zou Gengren	Commander of the 47th Group Army; 2000–2002	Succeeded by Xu Fenlin
Preceded by Qu Fanghuan	Chief of Staff of the Lanzhou Military Region; 2002–2003	Succeeded by Wang Guosheng
Preceded by Gao Zhongxing	Chief of Staff of the Beijing Military Region; 2003–2004	Succeeded by Qiu Jinkai
Preceded by Qian Guoliang	Commander of the Shenyang Military Region; 2004–2007	Succeeded by Zhang Youxia
Preceded by Chen Bingde	Head of the People's Liberation Army General Armaments Department; 2007–2012	Succeeded by Zhang Youxia
Government offices
Preceded by General Liang Guanglie	Minister of National Defense; 2013 – 2018	Succeeded by General Wei Fenghe
