= Richard Goodbody =

British Army officer (1903–1981)

General Sir Richard Goodbody GCB KBE DSO
- Born: 12 April 1903
- Died: 29 April 1981 (aged 78)
- Military career
- Allegiance: United Kingdom
- Branch: British Army
- Service years: 1923–1963
- Rank: General
- Service number: 26967
- Unit: Royal Artillery
- Commands: Northern Command (1957–1960); Royal Artillery (1954–57); 56th (London) Armoured Division (1951–1954); Royal School of Artillery (1949–1951); 15th Infantry Brigade (1947–1948); 2nd Armoured Brigade (1944); 11th Regiment, Royal Horse Artillery (1942–1943)
- Conflicts: Second World War
- Awards: Knight Grand Cross of the Order of the Bath; Knight Commander of the Order of the British Empire; Companion of the Distinguished Service Order; Mentioned in Despatches

General Sir Richard Wakefield Goodbody, GCB, KBE, DSO (12 April 1903 – 29 April 1981) was a senior British Army officer who served as Adjutant General from 1960 to 1963.

== Military career ==
Educated at Rugby School and the Royal Military Academy, Woolwich, Richard Goodbody was commissioned into the Royal Artillery on 29 August 1923. Orde Wingate and Douglas Packard were among his fellow graduates, both of whom also rose to general officer's rank. He was promoted to lieutenant on 29 August 1925. He was posted to the Royal Horse Artillery in 1927. He served in the Second World War, commanding the 2nd Armoured Brigade from 1943 to 1946 and being appointed a Companion of the Distinguished Service Order in 1943.

After the war, Goodbody became Commander, Royal Artillery for the 7th Armoured Division in March 1946, commander of the 15th Infantry Brigade in June 1947 and Commandant on the Royal School of Artillery in December 1949. He went on to become General Officer Commanding 56th (London) Armoured Division in April 1951, Director of the Royal Artillery in April 1954 and General Officer Commanding-in-Chief of Northern Command in May 1957. His last appointment was as Adjutant General in July 1960 before he retired in June 1963.

In the late 1950s Goodbody chaired a Committee investigating a shortage of entrants to the Royal Military College, Sandhurst. He was also Colonel Commandant of the Royal Artillery from 1957 to 1968, Colonel Commandant of the Royal Horse Artillery from 1960 to 1968, and ADC General to the Queen from 1961 to 1963. He lived in Blandford Forum, Dorset.

Goodbody was appointed a Companion of the Order of the Bath in 1953 and upgraded to a Knight Grand Cross of the Order of the Bath in 1963. He was also appointed a Knight Commander of the Order of the British Empire in 1958.

Military offices
Preceded by Harold Pyman	GOC 56th (London) Armoured Division; 1951–1954	Succeeded by David Dawnay
Preceded by Sir Geoffrey Evans	GOC-in-C Northern Command; 1957–1960	Succeeded by Sir Michael West
Preceded by Sir Hugh Stockwell	Adjutant General; 1960–1963	Succeeded by Sir James Cassels
Preceded by Sir Julian Gascoigne	Colonel Commandant and President, Honourable Artillery Company; 1959–1966	Succeeded by Sir Rodney Moore
Heraldic offices
Preceded by Sir James Robb	King of Arms of the Order of the Bath; 1965–1976	Succeeded by Sir Michael Pollock
