= Ba Zhongtan =

Chinese lieutenant general (1930–2018)

Ba Zhongtan (Chinese: 巴忠倓; January 1930 – 15 November 2018) was a lieutenant general of the Chinese People's Liberation Army (PLA) and the People's Armed Police (PAP). He served as commander of the Shanghai Garrison from 1985 to 1992 and of the PAP from December 1992 to February 1996.

== Career ==
Ba was born in Yantai, Shandong, China in January 1930. He enlisted in the People's Liberation Army in 1949 and joined the Chinese Communist Party in 1950. Ba worked in East China and the Nanjing Military Region as a staff officer. He was later promoted to the deputy chief of staff of the Nanjing Military Region. In August 1985 he became commander of the Shanghai Garrison. In September 1988 he was promoted to the rank of major general. On 28 February 1992 his rank was changed from major general of the People's Liberation Army into the rank of major-general of the People's Armed Police (PAP). In 1993 he was promoted to lieutenant general in the PAP. He was considered a protege of General Secretary of the Chinese Communist Party Jiang Zemin, who was Shanghai's mayor when Ba served as commander of the Shanghai Garrison.

== Dismissal ==
On 2 February 1996, Li Peiyao, one of the 19 vice chairmen of the National People's Congress, was murdered at his home in a bungled burglary by Zhang Jinlong (张金龙), a member of the Beijing PAP. As a result, Ba was retired and replaced by Lt. Gen. Yang Guoping. After retiring from military service, Ba later served as chairman of the Council for National Security Policy Studies and chairman of the Shanghai Water Resource Protection Foundation.

== Death ==
Ba died on 15 November 2018 in Beijing, aged 88.
