= Liang Guanglie =

Chinese army general (1940–2024)

General Liang Guanglie
- 梁光烈
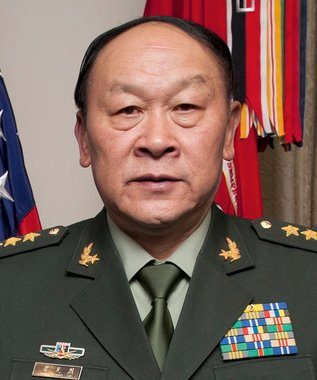
- Liang in 2012

State Councilor of China
- In office 17 March 2008 – 16 March 2013
- Premier: Wen Jiabao

10th Minister of National Defense
- In office 17 March 2008 – 16 March 2013
- Premier: Wen Jiabao
- Preceded by: Cao Gangchuan
- Succeeded by: Chang Wanquan

Head of the People's Liberation Army General Staff Department
- In office November 2002 – 2007
- Preceded by: Fu Quanyou
- Succeeded by: Chen Bingde

Personal details
- Born: 9 December 1940 Santai, Sichuan, China
- Died: 12 November 2024 (aged 83) Beijing, China
- Party: Chinese Communist Party
- Education: Henan University

Military service
- Allegiance: People's Republic of China
- Branch/service: People's Liberation Army Ground Force
- Years of service: 1958–2013
- Rank: General
- Commands: Ministry of National Defense (1998–2003); PLA General Staff Department (2002–2007); Nanjing Military Region (1999–2002); Shenyang Military Region (1997–1999); 54th Group Army (1990–1993); 20th Group Army (1985–1990)

Liang Guanglie (Chinese: 梁光烈; pinyin: Liáng Guāngliè, also spelled as Liang Kuang-lieh; 9 December 1940 – 12 November 2024) was a Chinese general and who served as the Minister of National Defense from 2008 to 2013.

== Life and career ==
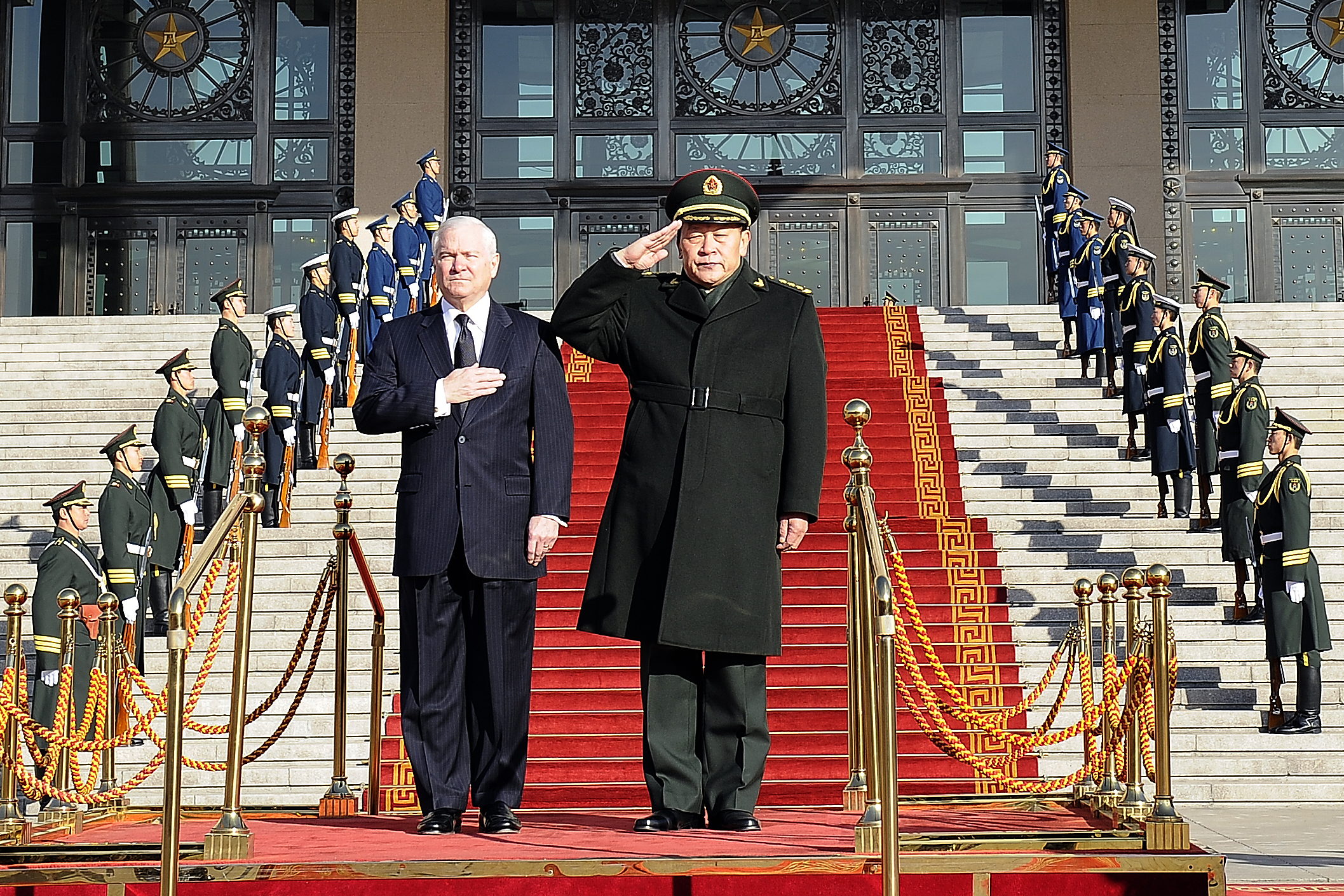
Liang with the visiting U.S. Secretary of Defense Robert M. Gates in Beijing, 2011

Liang joined the army in January 1958 and the Chinese Communist Party in November 1959. His first assignment was with the Second Regiment, First Division of the 1st Ground Force Army (1958–63), where he rose to the ranks of commander of an engineering company, quartermaster of the special agent company and staff officer in the operations and training branch. Liang studied at the Xinyang Infantry School (1963–64) and graduated from Henan University's political theory correspondence education program (1984–86). After finishing his studies, Liang returned to his unit until 1970 when he was promoted to the Operational Department staff of the Wuhan Military Region command headquarters where he remained until 1979.

Liang was named Deputy Commander of the 58th Division, 20th Group Army in 1979 and became commander in 1981–83. After a study break at the PLA Military Academy (March 1982 to January 1983), he was named deputy Commander of the 20th Army in 1983 and Commander in 1985. In June 1989, he led the 20th Army to enforce martial law in Beijing to suppress the Tiananmen Square Protests. In 1990 he was transferred to command the 54th Army and from December 1993 to July 1995, he was the chief of staff of Beijing Military Region. From July 1995 to December 1997, he was the deputy commander of Beijing Military Region. From December 1997 to December 1999, he was the commander of Shenyang Military Region, and from December 1999 to November 2002, he was the commander of Nanjing Military Region and deputy secretary of CCP's committee.

Liang was the General Chief of Staff of the People's Liberation Army from 2002 to 2007. He then served as a State Councilor and the Minister of National Defense. Additionally Liang was a member of Central Military Commission. He was also an alternate member of the 13th and 14th CCP Central Committees, and a member of the 15th, 16th and 17th Central Committees.

Liang retired at the 18th National Congress of the Chinese Communist Party in late 2012 and was replaced by General Chang Wanquan.

Liang died in Beijing on 12 November 2024, at the age of 83 (Chinese media counted as aged 84 according to Chinese custom).

Military offices
Preceded by Yang Shiyi	Commander of the 20th Group Army; 1985–1990	Succeeded by Ding Shouyue
Preceded by Zhu Chao	Commander of the 54th Group Army; 1990–1993	Succeeded by Zhang Xianglin
Preceded by Huang Yunqiao	Chief of Staff of the Beijing Military Region; 1993–1995	Succeeded by Huang Xinsheng
Preceded by Li Xinliang	Commander of the Shenyang Military Region; 1997–1999	Succeeded by Qian Guoliang
Preceded by Chen Bingde	Commander of the Nanjing Military Region; 1999–2002	Succeeded by Zhu Wenquan
Preceded by General Fu Quanyou	Head of the People's Liberation Army General Staff Department; 2002–2007	Succeeded by General Chen Bingde
Government offices
Preceded by General Cao Gangchuan	Minister of National Defense; 2008–2013	Succeeded by General Chang Wanquan
