= Ma Weizhi =

- 马伟志

Chief of Staff of the Jinan Military Region
- In office February 1988 – April 1990
- Commander: Li Jiulong
- Preceded by: Guo Fuzhou
- Succeeded by: Yang Guoping

Personal details
- Born: Ma Dianrong; 1930 Muling County, Heilongjiang, China
- Died: 2024 (aged 93–94) Beijing, China
- Party: Chinese Communist Party
- Education: People's Liberation Army Military Academy

Military service
- Allegiance: People's Republic of China
- Branch/service: People's Liberation Army Ground Force
- Years of service: 1945–1994
- Rank: Lieutenant general
- Battles/wars: Chinese Civil War; Korean War

Chinese name
- Simplified Chinese: 马伟志
- Traditional Chinese: 馬偉志
Transcriptions
Standard Mandarin
- Hanyu Pinyin: Mǎ Wěizhì

Ma Dianrong
- Simplified Chinese: 马殿荣
- Traditional Chinese: 馬殿榮
Transcriptions
Standard Mandarin
- Hanyu Pinyin: Mǎ Diànróng

Ma Weizhi (Chinese: 马伟志; 1930 – 14 April 2024) was a lieutenant general in the People's Liberation Army of China who served as deputy commander and chief of staff of the Jinan Military Region from 1988 to 1990.

== Biography ==
Ma was born Ma Dianrong (马殿荣) in Muling County (now Muling), Heilongjiang, in 1930.

Ma enlisted in the Northeast People's Autonomous Army (later renamed Northeast People's Liberation Army) in September 1945, and joined the Chinese Communist Party (CCP) in 1947. During the Chinese Civil War, he served in the Fourth Field Army and engaged in the Liaoshen campaign and Pingjin campaign. During the Korean War, in 1951, he was commissioned as chief of the Operations Training Department of the People's Volunteer Army. In 1961, he graduated from the People's Liberation Army Military Academy. In December 1982, he became commander of the 19th Army, a position he held until June 1985, while the army was disbanded. When he was commander of the 19th Army, Guo Boxiong was the chief of staff. In June 1985, he was promoted to deputy commander of the Lanzhou Military Region. He was deputy commander of the Jinan Military Region in February 1988, in addition to serving as chief of staff. He attained the rank of lieutenant general (zhongjiang) in 1988. In April 1990, he was appointed vice president of the PLA National Defence University, serving in the post until his retirement in December 1994.

On 14 April 2024, Ma died in Beijing, at the age of 94.

Military offices
Preceded by Guo Fuzhou	Chief of Staff of the Jinan Military Region; 1988–1990	Succeeded by Yang Guoping
