= Wu Shuangzhan =

Retired Chinese general

Commander of the People's Armed Police
- In office 1999–2009
- Preceded by: Yang Guoping
- Succeeded by: Wang Jianping

Personal details
- Born: 1945 (age 80–81) Qingfeng County, Henan, China
- Party: Chinese Communist Party

Wu Shuangzhan (simplified Chinese: 吴双战; traditional Chinese: 吳雙戰; pinyin: Wú Shuāngzhàn) is a retired Chinese general who served as commander of the People's Armed Police from 1999 to 2009. On June 20, 2004, he was awarded the military rank of general (shang jiang). He was a member of the 16th and 17th Central Committees of the Chinese Communist Party.

== Career ==
Wu Shuangzhan was born in 1945 in Qingfeng County, Henan province. He joined the People's Liberation Army in 1963. He became major general in 1990, but was then transferred to the People's Armed Police in 1993. In the PAP, he became lieutenant general in 1997 and general in 2004.
