= Michael West (British Army officer) =

British Army general

General Sir Michael West GCB DSO & Two Bars
- Born: 27 October 1905
- Died: 14 May 1978 (aged 72); Bembridge, Isle of Wight, England
- Military career
- Allegiance: United Kingdom
- Branch: British Army
- Service years: 1925–1965
- Rank: General
- Service number: 33582
- Unit: Oxfordshire and Buckinghamshire Light Infantry
- Commands: 2nd Battalion, South Lancashire Regiment; 5th Infantry Brigade; 2nd Infantry Division; 1st Commonwealth Division; 1st (British) Corps; Northern Command
- Conflicts: Second World War; Battle of Madagascar; Burma campaign; Korean War
- Awards: Knight Grand Cross of the Order of the Bath; Companion of the Distinguished Service Order & Two Bars; Mentioned in Despatches; Commander of the Legion of Merit (United States)

General Sir Michael Montgomerie Alston-Roberts-West, GCB, DSO & Two Bars (27 October 1905 – 14 May 1978), better known as Sir Michael M.A.R. West, was a senior British Army officer who achieved high office in the 1960s. He served in the Second World War and the Korean War, where he commanded the 1st Commonwealth Division and later became General Officer Commanding-in-Chief (GOC-in-C) for Northern Command. West was a witty and unconventional soldier, with a taste for partying and jazz.

== Early life and military career ==
West was the son of Captain Harry Charles John Alston-Roberts-West, RN, and Olive Molyneux-Montgomerie, who was the granddaughter of Henry Lascelles, 2nd Earl of Harewood.

West was commissioned as a second lieutenant into the Oxfordshire and Buckinghamshire Light Infantry, British Army, in 1925. He went to India, serving with the 2nd Battalion, in 1935.

He served in the Second World War (1939–1945), initially as a brigade major for the 163rd Infantry Brigade. He was then appointed Commanding officer (CO) of the 2nd Battalion, South Lancashire Regiment and was deployed to Madagascar in 1942. He became Deputy Commander of the 72nd Indian Infantry Brigade in 1943 and Commander of the 5th Infantry Brigade in Burma in 1944.

After the war he joined the School of Infantry in 1946 moving on to be Deputy Director of Manpower Planning at the War Office in 1949. He was appointed General Officer Commanding-in-Chief (GOC-in-C) British Troops in Austria in 1950. West was appointed General officer commanding (GOC) of the 1st Commonwealth Division in Korea from 1952 to 1953 and has been described as "the architect of British strategy in the Korean War". He was appointed a Commander of the Legion of Merit by the United States for his service in Korea.

He was Director of the Territorial Army (TA) from 1955 and then GOC 1st (British) Corps, part of the British Army of the Rhine (BAOR), from 1958. He became GOC-in-C for Northern Command in 1960 and Head of the British Defence Staff in Washington, D.C., and UK Representative on the NATO Standing Group in 1962.

West was often routinely provocative and, as a relatively junior officer, he regularly challenged US President Dwight D. Eisenhower's planning and was "invariably" found to be right. Despite his successes and influence, West was thought to be too unpredictable for the highest levels of command and he retired in September 1965.

West was a friend or acquaintance of musicians Mick Jagger and Bob Dylan. He was a keen dancer and artist, and used to drive a London taxi.

There is a memorial to him in the Church at Whitchurch in Warwickshire.

== Family ==
On 24 August 1935, he married Christine Sybil Oppenheim, from Newbury. The couple had one daughter, Carinthia (who was courted by Mick Jagger).

== Honours and awards ==
- Knight Grand Cross of the Order of the Bath 13 June 1964 (KCB 1 January 1959, CB 7 June 1951)
- Companion of the Distinguished Service Order 24 May 1945, 28 June 1945, 8 December 1953
- Mentioned in despatches 8 December 1953
- Commander, Legion of Merit (United States) 10 August 1954

Military offices
| Preceded by Ernest Pepper | Commandant of the School of Infantry; 1945–1948 | Succeeded by Cecil Firbank |
| Preceded by Sir Harold Pyman | GOC 1st (British) Corps; 1958–1960 | Succeeded by Sir Charles Jones |
| Preceded by Sir Richard Goodbody | GOC-in-C Northern Command; 1960–1962 | Succeeded by Sir Charles Jones |
| Preceded by Sir George Mills | Head of the British Defence Staff in Washington, D.C. and UK Military Representative to NATO; 1962–1965 | Succeeded by Sir Nigel Henderson |
