= Zhang Taiheng =

Chinese general (1931–2005)

- 张太恒

Commander of Jinan Military Region
- In office October 1992 – November 1996
- Preceded by: Zhang Wannian
- Succeeded by: Qian Guoliang

Commander of Chengdu Military Region
- In office April 1990 – 1991
- Preceded by: Fu Quanyou
- Succeeded by: Li Jiulong

Personal details
- Born: 5 March 1931 Guangrao County, Shandong, China
- Died: 29 January 2005 (aged 73) Beijing, China
- Party: Chinese Communist Party
- Education: PLA Military Academy

Military service
- Allegiance: People's Republic of China
- Branch/service: People's Liberation Army Ground Force
- Years of service: 1944–2005
- Rank: General
- Battles/wars: Chinese Civil War

Chinese name
- Simplified Chinese: 张太恒
- Traditional Chinese: 張太恆
Transcriptions
Standard Mandarin
- Hanyu Pinyin: Zhāng Tàihéng

Zhang Taiheng (Chinese: 张太恒; 5 March 1931 – 29 January 2005) was a general (shangjiang) of the People's Liberation Army (PLA). He was a delegate to the 6th, 7th and 8th National People's Congress. He was a member of the Standing Committee of the 9th Chinese People's Political Consultative Conference.

== Biography ==
Zhang was born in Guangrao County, Shandong, on 5 March 1931. He enlisted in the Eighth Route Army in September 1944, and joined the Chinese Communist Party (CCP) in May 1948. During the Chinese Civil War, he served in the East China Field Army.

After founding of the Communist State, he worked in the Nanjing Military Region. In June 1985, he became deputy commander of Chengdu Military Region, rising to commander in April 1990. He became commander of Jinan Military Region in October 1992, and served until November 1996.

On 29 January 2005, he died from an illness in Beijing, at the age of 73.

He was promoted to the rank of lieutenant general (zhongjiang) in 1988 and general (shangjiang) in June 1994.

Military offices
Preceded by Fu Quanyou	Commander of Chengdu Military Region; 1990–1991	Succeeded by Li Jiulong
Preceded by Zhang Wannian	Commander of Jinan Military Region; 1992–1996	Succeeded by Qian Guoliang
