= James Cassels (British Army officer) =

British Army officer (1907–1996)

Field Marshal Sir James Cassels GCB KBE DSO
- General Sir James Cassels, pictured here in 1968.
- Born: 28 February 1907; Quetta, Baluchistan, British India
- Died: 13 December 1996 (aged 89); Newmarket, Suffolk, England
- Relatives: Sir Robert Cassels (father)
- Military career
- Allegiance: United Kingdom
- Branch: British Army
- Service years: 1926–1968
- Rank: Field Marshal
- Service number: 36316
- Unit: Seaforth Highlanders
- Commands: Chief of the General Staff (1965–68); British Army of the Rhine (1960–63); Northern Army Group (1960–63); Eastern Command (1959–60); I Corps (1953–54); 1st Commonwealth Division (1951–52); 6th Airborne Division (1946); 51st (Highland) Infantry Division (1945–46); 152nd Infantry Brigade (1944–45); 1st Battalion, Tyneside Scottish (1943)
- Conflicts: Second World War; Palestine Emergency; Korean War; Malayan Emergency
- Awards: Knight Grand Cross of the Order of the Bath; Knight Commander of the Order of the British Empire; Companion of the Distinguished Service Order; Mentioned in Despatches; Legion of Merit (United States); Commander of the Order of the Defender of the Realm (Malaysia)

Field Marshal Sir Archibald James Halkett Cassels, GCB, KBE, DSO (28 February 1907 – 13 December 1996) was a senior British Army officer who served as Chief of the General Staff (CGS), the professional head of the British Army, from 1965 to 1968. As a young man he was a first-class cricket player, initially playing in India for the Europeans against the Hindus in the Lahore Tournament and going on to play for a Punjab Governor's XI against Northern India team and for a Viceroy's XI against the Roshanara Club. He later played for the British Army cricket team against the RAF at The Oval and then played for the Egyptian national side against HM Martineau's XI in Alexandria.

Cassels served in the Second World War as commander of the 152nd Infantry Brigade, commanding the brigade during Operation Goodwood, Operation Totalize and Operation Veritable, before becoming General Officer Commanding 51st (Highland) Division in the closing stages of the war. He later commanded the 1st Commonwealth Division in the Korean War and was General Officer Commanding of the 1 (British) Corps before becoming director of operations in Malaya during the Malayan Emergency.

Cassels went on to be commander, Northern Army Group, then General Officer Commanding Eastern Command and then Commander-in-Chief (C-in-C) of the British Army of the Rhine (BAOR). As Chief of the General Staff, he advised the British government on the implementation of the 1966 Defence White Paper.

== Early life and military career ==
James Cassels was born in Quetta, British India (now Pakistan), on 28 February 1907, the son of Robert Cassels (later General Sir Robert Cassels), a British Indian Army officer, and Florence Emily Cassels (née Jackson). Upon being sent to England, he was educated at Rugby School and, later, at the Royal Military College, Sandhurst, where he won the Sword of Honour.

Upon Passing out from Sandhurst, Cassels was commissioned as a second lieutenant into the Seaforth Highlanders, a line infantry regiment of the British Army, on 30 August 1926. He was posted to Central India with the 2nd Battalion of his regiment in 1928 and, having been promoted to lieutenant on 20 August 1929, was appointed aide-de-camp (ADC) to his father in May 1930. He became adjutant of the 2nd Battalion, Seaforths, then serving in England and commanded by Lieutenant Colonel Sir John Laurie, who would feature numerous times in his career, in March 1934 and was promoted to captain on 22 March 1938.

== Cricket career ==
James Cassels
Cricket information
- Batting: Right-handed
- Bowling: Right-arm fast-medium/Off spin
- Role: All-rounder

Domestic team information
- Years: Team
- 1928: Europeans (Lahore)
- 1928: Punjab Governor's XI
- 1932: Viceroy's XI
- 1932–1935: Army
- FC debut: 17 March 1928 Europeans v Hindus
- Last FC: 1 June 1935 Army v Cambridge University

Career statistics
Competition	First-class
Matches	5
Runs scored	197
Batting average	39.40
100s/50s	0/2
Top score	72
Balls bowled	954
Wickets	20
Bowling average	20.75
5 wickets in innings	2
10 wickets in match	0
Best bowling	6/51
Catches/stumpings	5/–
- Source: CricketArchive, 31 May 2008

A right-handed batsman and right-arm fast-medium/Off spin bowler, he played first-class cricket between 1928 and 1935 and also represented the Egyptian national team.

His first recorded match came in 1921 when he played for his school team against Marlborough College at Lord's. His first-class debut was in 1928 when he played for the Europeans against the Hindus in the Lahore Tournament, a tournament similar to the more famous Bombay Quadrangular Tournament but played in Lahore, then a part of India. He played for a Punjab Governor's XI against Northern India team in his second first-class match later that month, also in Lahore. He took 6/51 in the second innings of that match, his best innings bowling performance in first-class cricket.

He played his next first-class match in Delhi in February 1932, playing for a Viceroy's XI against the Roshanara Club. He played his first first-class match in England that June, playing for the British Army cricket team against the RAF at The Oval, making his highest first-class score of 72. The following year he played for the Egyptian national side against HM Martineau's XI in Alexandria, taking five wickets in the second innings of the visitors.

He played his final first-class match in the 1935 English season, playing for the Army against Cambridge University. He continued to play cricket at a lower level, playing for Delhi against Lord Tennyson's XI in 1938. After the war, he played twice for the Army against the Royal Navy, in 1948 and 1949, and against Cambridge University in 1949.

== Second World War ==
=== Service in Britain ===
Cassels served in the Second World War, which began in September 1939. The outbreak of war found Cassels serving in England, and he soon attended a shortened course at the Staff College, Camberley. In May 1940 he then became a brigade major with a Territorial Army (TA) unit, the 157th Infantry Brigade, commanded by Brigadier Sir John Laurie, formerly Cassels's commanding officer (CO) in the 2nd Seaforths, part of Major General James Drew's 52nd (Lowland) Infantry Division. The division was sent to France in June 1940 to bolster the French Army in the aftermath of the British Expeditionary Force's (BEF) evacuation from Dunkirk. Cassel's brigade, the first of the 52nd Division's brigades to arrive in France, was, soon after its arrival, ordered to form the right of the French Tenth Army at Conches, Normandy. However, the situation was considered to be hopeless and Cassel's brigade was later withdrawn through Cherbourg on 18 June. The French signed the second armistice of Compiègne just days later.

He remained with the division until October 1941 when he became deputy director (Plans) at the War Office. He returned to the 52nd Division in July 1942, where he became a General Staff Officer Grade 1 (GSO1) to Major General Sir John Laurie, the division's General Officer Commanding (GOC), who was replaced in September by Major General Neil Ritchie. He remained with the 52nd Division until he received an active command in the shape of the 1st Battalion, Tyneside Scottish in January 1943. The battalion was, along with the 10th and 11th Battalions of the Durham Light Infantry (DLI), part of the 70th Infantry Brigade of the 49th (West Riding) Infantry Division, whose GOC was Major General Henry Curtis until he was succeeded in late April by Major General Evelyn Barker. The division had been assigned a leading role in the invasion of Normandy, which was to take place in spring the following year, and training was extremely tough, conducted in Scotland. Cassels was promoted to major on 30 August 1943. He was not destined to lead the battalion in action, however, as in January 1944 he was promoted to acting brigadier and became Brigadier General Staff (BGS) of XII Corps, serving again under Neil Ritchie, responsible for the planning for Operation Overlord, codename for the Allied invasion of Normandy.

=== Northwest Europe ===
In late June Cassels was given command of the 152nd Infantry Brigade, one of three brigades forming part of the veteran 51st (Highland) Infantry Division – the others being 153rd and 154th. The division was then fighting in Normandy after having landed there earlier in the month shortly after D-Day on 6 June. The division had, under Major General Douglas Wimberley, fought with distinction in North Africa and Sicily from 1942 to 1943 as part of the British Eighth Army under General Sir Bernard Montgomery, and, by now a veteran formation, had been brought back to the United Kingdom by Montgomery, upon his promotion to command the 21st Army Group in December 1943, to spearhead the Normandy invasion. In France, however, the division, now commanded by Major General Charles Bullen-Smith and war-weary, had performed, Montgomery felt, very poorly. In mid-July, shortly after Cassels took over command of the 152nd Brigade, Montgomery wrote to Field Marshal Sir Alan Brooke, the Chief of the Imperial General Staff (CIGS), the professional head of the British Army, and informed him that, in his opinion (but shared also by Lieutenant Generals John Crocker and Miles Dempsey, GOCs of I Corps and British Second Army respectively), the 51st Division was, under Bullen-Smith, not battleworthy and decided to replace him with Major General Thomas Rennie, who had served with the division in Africa and Sicily.

Cassels's brigade fought briefly in Operation Goodwood, the British attempt to break out of the Normandy beachhead, following up behind the 11th Armoured Division and securing the ground gained, in which positions it remained for the next month. The division, now under Major General Rennie, transferring from I Corps to Lieutenant General Guy Simonds' II Canadian Corps, then took part in Operation Totalize, which succeeded, with Cassels' brigade taking Tilly-la-Campagne, its objective, with light casualties. The division then participated in Operation Tractable, in an attempt to prevent the German Army from escaping the Falaise Pocket. Cassels was slightly injured, and two nearby officers were both killed, when his brigade HQ was strafed by a friendly US Army Air Force (USAAF) bomber. The brigade later led the division's crossing of the river Seine on 1 September and, by the evening, the 5th Battalion, Queen's Own Cameron Highlanders had liberated Saint-Valery-en-Caux.

Alongside the 49th Division, the 51st Division, now serving under I Corps again, was assigned the task of capturing the French port of Le Havre. The attack, codenamed Operation Astonia, began on 10 September and, with Cassels' brigade having achieved all its objectives, the German garrison surrendered on 12 September.

By October the division was on the Dutch border where, on 23 October, Operation Colin was launched. Cassels' brigade took the town of Vught and, by 31 October, had reached the river Maas, before going on to clear the area west of 's-Hertogenbosch. Finally, the brigade carried out an assault crossing of the Noorder canal and, apart from holding the line, was not involved in any further major actions for the rest of the year.

In January 1945 the brigade was in the Ardennes forest, in February moving to the Reichswald forest where it was involved in Operation Veritable and, despite heavy fighting in terrible conditions, managed to clear the south-western edge of the forest. The brigade, along with the rest of the division, now part of XXX Corps under Lieutenant General Brian Horrocks, had a short rest after this, and began training for their next assignment, Operation Plunder, an amphibious assault crossing of the river Rhine. The operation began on the night of 23 March 1945, with Cassels' brigade crossing the river the following day. On the same day, however, the division's GOC, Major General Rennie, was killed by mortar fire and replaced as GOC by Major General Gordon MacMillan, a highly experienced and competent commander, who had led Cassels's brigade in Sicily. Despite the loss of the GOC, the division, Cassels's brigade in particular, was involved in heavy fighting in an attempt to expand the bridgehead. The brigade then advanced across Germany, and was at Bremen by late April, with the end of World War II in Europe following shortly after. For Cassels's leadership of the 152nd Brigade during the Normandy campaign, he was appointed a Commander of the Order of the British Empire on 28 September 1944 and appointed a Companion of the Distinguished Service Order (DSO) on 21 December 1944.

Cassels was promoted to the rank of acting major general and appointed GOC of the 51st Division on 28 May 1945, taking over from Major General MacMillan. Aged just 38, he was the second youngest British divisional commander of the Second World War, with only Major General Richard Hull, GOC of the 5th Infantry Division, being two months younger, and Cassels himself being only three months younger than Major General Philip Roberts, GOC of the 11th Armoured Division. He was mentioned in despatches on 8 November 1945.

== Postwar ==
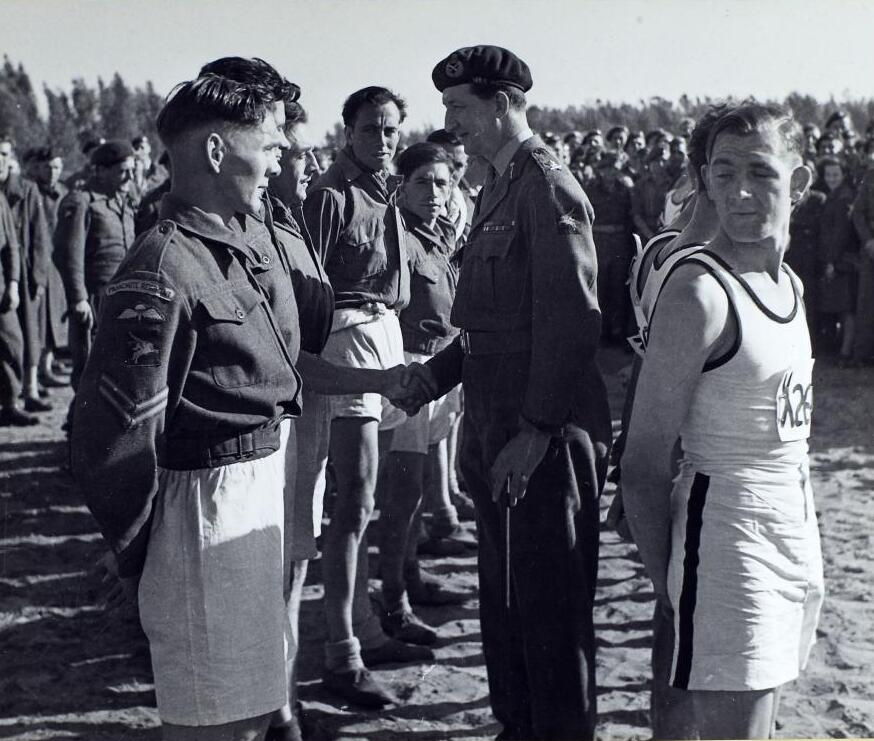
Major General James Cassels, GOC 6th Airborne Division, congratulates men of the cross country running team of the 8th Parachute Battalion on the occasion of the division's cross country run in which they ran second. Picture taken in Palestine, March 1946.

After the war he continued to command the 51st Division in Germany until March 1946 when he was selected to command the 6th Airborne Division. The division, which had fought with distinction in Northwest Europe, was then serving in Palestine during the Palestine Emergency (for further information see 6th Airborne Division in Palestine). Cassels's time there was not altogether happy. "I was in Palestine from March 1946 until the end of the year, ten hellish months. I got appallingly rude letters from America, saying that I was much worse than Hitler, addressed to me personally. We nearly had seizures every time we read a newspaper. The general line was that we were anti-semitic beasts and murderers. I don't think they realized that many of my men had parachuted into Normandy in June 1944. Large numbers of them were killed and wounded fighting to remove Hitler from the face of the earth." "It did make one hopping mad to see some of the comments in the Press...denigrating all or most of our actions. They sat in comfort and safety in England while we lived in fairly uncomfortable conditions and under the continued...threat of being blown up!!"

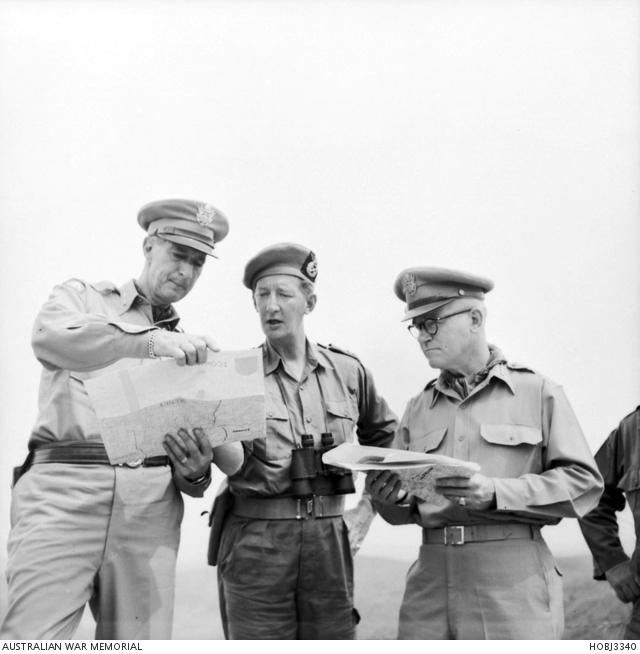
General Mark W. Clark (left), Cassels and General J. Lawton Collins, both of the U.S. Army, in Korea, July 1952.

He relinquished command of the division to Major General Eric Bols in early 1947 to return to England, where he attended the prestigious Imperial Defence College. For his services in Palestine he was mentioned in despatches. Promoted to the substantive rank of colonel on 19 August 1947, he became Director of Land / Air Warfare at the War Office in January 1948. Having been promoted to brigadier on 4 March 1948 and to major general on 20 December 1948, he became Chief Liaison Officer with the United Kingdom Services Liaison Staff at Melbourne in Australia on 16 December 1949 and was appointed a Companion of the Order of the Bath in the New Year Honours 1950. He became the first GOC of the 1st Commonwealth Division in July 1951 during the Korean War for which he was awarded the Legion of Merit in the Degree of Commander by the U.S. President, Harry S. Truman on 16 September 1952 and appointed a Knight Commander of the Order of the British Empire on 10 October 1952.

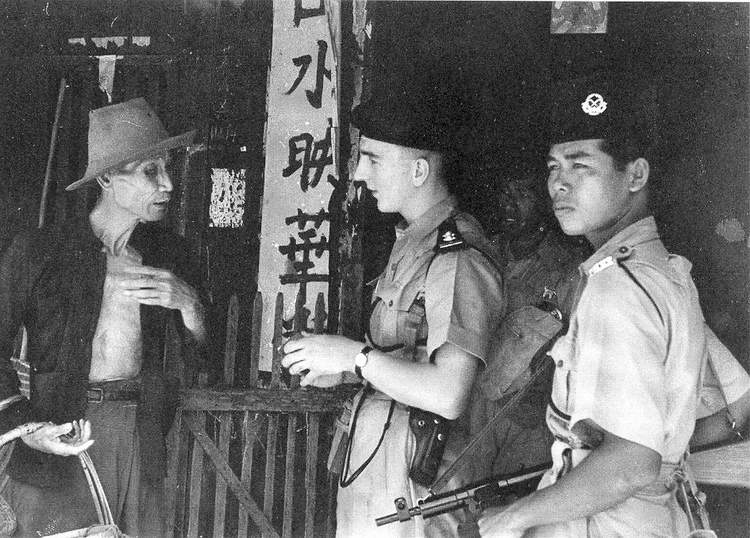
Cassels served as director of operations during the Malayan Emergency.

He was made GOC of the 1 (British) Corps on 4 January 1953 and, having been promoted to the rank of lieutenant-general on 2 February 1954, became Director of Military Training at the War Office on 15 November 1954. He was appointed director of operations in Malaya on 17 September 1957 during the Malayan Emergency and, having been promoted to full general on 29 November 1958, became General Officer Commanding-in-Chief (GOC-in-C) for Eastern Command on 29 June 1959. He commanded the Northern Army Group and was Commander-in-Chief (C-in-C) of the British Army of the Rhine (BAOR) on 7 January 1960 and, having advanced to Knight Grand Cross of the Order of the Bath in the New Year Honours 1961, became Adjutant-General to the Forces on 1 June 1963. He became Chief of the General Staff (CGS), the professional head of the British Army, on 8 February 1965 and advised the British government on the implementation of the 1966 Defence White Paper which, inter alia, established the Territorial and Army Volunteer Reserve (TAVR). He was promoted to field marshal on 29 February 1968 on his retirement from the British Army.

He was also colonel of the Seaforth Highlanders (Ross-shire Buffs, The Duke of Albany's) from 15 March 1957 and Colonel Commandant of the Royal Military Police from 27 May 1957. He was also a member of the Committee of the Marylebone Cricket Club.

His interests included fishing, dance music, playing the guitar and the clarinet and playing various sports including cricket, polo and golf. He died at Newmarket in Suffolk on 13 December 1996.

== Family ==
In 1935 he married Joyce Kirk; they had one son. Following the death of his first wife, he married Joy Dickson in 1978.

Military offices
Preceded by Gordon MacMillan	GOC 51st (Highland) Infantry Division; 1945–1946	Succeeded by Colin Barber
Preceded by Eric Bols	GOC 6th Airborne Division; March–December 1946	Succeeded by Eric Bols
New command	GOC 1st Commonwealth Division; 1951–1952	Succeeded by Michael West
Preceded by Sir Dudley Ward	GOC 1st (British) Corps; 1953–1954	Succeeded by Sir Hugh Stockwell
Honorary titles
Preceded by Sir John Laurie	Colonel of the Seaforth Highlanders; 1957–1961	Succeeded by Regiment consolidated to form the Queen's Own Highlanders (Seaforth and Camerons)
New title	Colonel of the Queen's Own Highlanders (Seaforth and Camerons); 1961–1966	Succeeded by Sir Peter Hunt
Military offices
Preceded by Sir Charles Coleman	GOC-in-C Eastern Command; 1959–1960	Succeeded by Sir Gerald Lathbury
Preceded by Sir Dudley Ward	C-in-C British Army of the Rhine; 1960–1963	Succeeded by Sir William Stirling
Preceded by Sir Richard Goodbody	Adjutant General; 1963–1964	Succeeded by Sir Reginald Hewetson
Preceded by Sir Richard Hull	Chief of the General Staff; 1965–1968	Succeeded by Sir Geoffrey Baker
