= Chen Bingde =

Chinese military officer

- 陈炳德
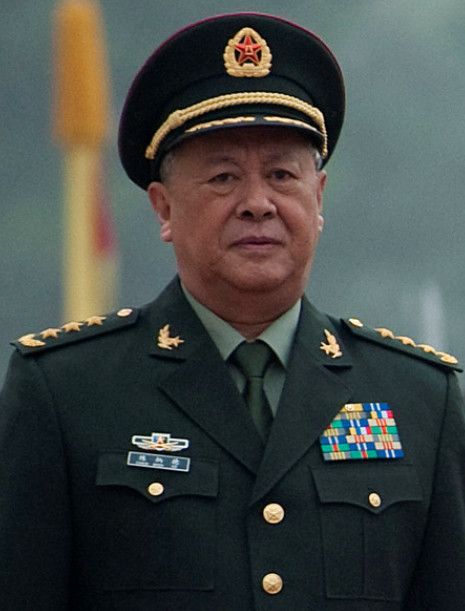
- Chen Bingde in 2011

Chief of the People's Liberation Army General Staff Department
- In office September 2007 – October 2012
- Preceded by: Liang Guanglie
- Succeeded by: Fang Fenghui

Head of the People's Liberation Army General Armaments Department
- In office September 2004 – September 2007
- Preceded by: Li Jinai
- Succeeded by: Chang Wanquan

Personal details
- Born: July 1941 (age 85) Nantong, Jiangsu, China
- Party: Chinese Communist Party
- Education: PLA Military Academy

Military service
- Allegiance: People's Republic of China
- Branch/service: People's Liberation Army Ground Force
- Years of service: 1961–2012
- Rank: General

Chen Bingde (simplified Chinese: 陈炳德; traditional Chinese: 陳炳德; pinyin: Chén Bǐngdé; born July 1941) is a retired general (shangjiang) in the People's Liberation Army (PLA). He was the Director-General of the General Armaments Department until September 2007. In this position he acted as the head of the space program of China. He then served as chief of the PLA General Staff Department. He retired in 2012, and was succeeded by General Fang Fenghui as chief of General Staff.

== Biography ==
Chen was born July 1941 in Nantong, Jiangsu. He joined the Chinese Communist Party (CCP) in 1962 and has been a member of the CCP Central Military Commission since 2004. He was former chief of the Nanjing Military Region, a crucial region in Beijing's military strategy against Taiwan.

In 2004, he was promoted to the director of the General Armaments Department as well as the secretary of CCP's committee. In 2007 he was promoted to head of General Staff Department. He attained the rank of major general in September 1988, lieutenant general in July 1995, and general in 2002. He was a member of CCP's 15th, 16th and 17th central committees.

Military offices
Preceded by Li Jinai	Head of the People's Liberation Army General Armaments Department; 2004–2007	Succeeded by Chang Wanquan
Preceded by Liang Guanglie	Chief of the People's Liberation Army General Staff Department; 2007–2012	Succeeded by Fang Fenghui
