= 47th Group Army =

People's Liberation Army 47th Group Army
- People's Liberation Army Flag of the People's Republic of China
- Active: 1948 - 2017
- Country: China
- Branch: 139th Mechanised Infantry Brigade; 55th Motorised Infantry Brigade; 56th Motorised Infantry Brigade; 9th Armoured Brigade; 1st Artillery Brigade; Anti-Aircraft Brigade
- Part of: Lanzhou Military Region
- Garrison/HQ: China Shaanxi Xi'an Lintong District
- March: Military Anthem of the People's Liberation Army
- Engagements: Long March; Second Sino-Japanese War; Chinese Civil War; Korean War; Vietnam War; Sino-Vietnamese War

Commanders
- Notable commanders: Peng Dehuai; Xiao Ke; Wang Zhen; Liang Xingchu; Guo Boxiong; Chang Wanquan

The 47th Group Army was a group army (corps-sized formation) of the People's Liberation Army It was stationed at Lintong District, Xi'an, Shaanxi as part of the Lanzhou Military Region. It was disbanded in 2016-17, during the Chinese military reforms which had begun two years earlier.

The 160th Division was created in March 1949 basing on the 1st Training Division of Northeastern Military Region. The division became a part of 47th Corps. In August 1949 the division was disbanded.

== Officers ==
=== Commanders ===
- Liang Xingchu: 1948-May 1949
- Cao Lihuai: 1949-1952
- Zhang Tianyun: 1952-1956
- Li Huamin: 1956-1960
- Yan Deming: 1960-1964
- Li Yuan: 1964-1975
- Hu Bohua: 1975-1980
- Zhang Defu: 1980
- Dong Zhanlin: 1985
- Qian Shugen: 1985-1992
- Guo Boxiong: 1992-1994
- Zou Gengwang: 1996-2000
- Chang Wanquan: 2000-2002
- Xu Fenlin: 2002-2003
- Peng Yong: 2003-2011
- Cao Yimin: 2011-2013
- Zhang Lianyi: 2013–present

=== Political commissars ===
- Zhou Chiping
- Li Renlin
- Liu Xianquan
- Chen Fahong
- Sun Zheng
