= Jamestown Line =

Series of defensive positions in the Korean War

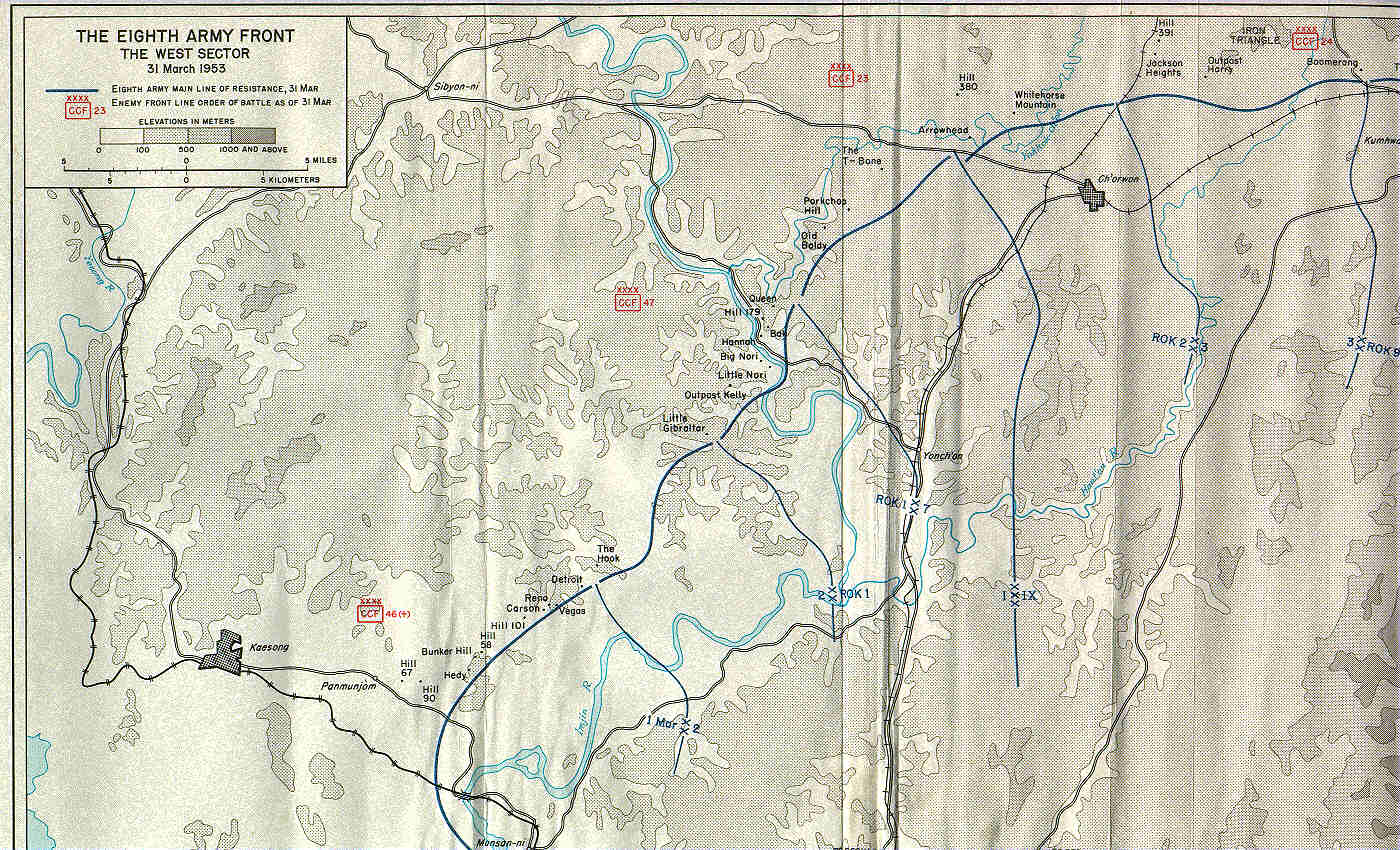
Jamestown Line, west sector 31 March 1953

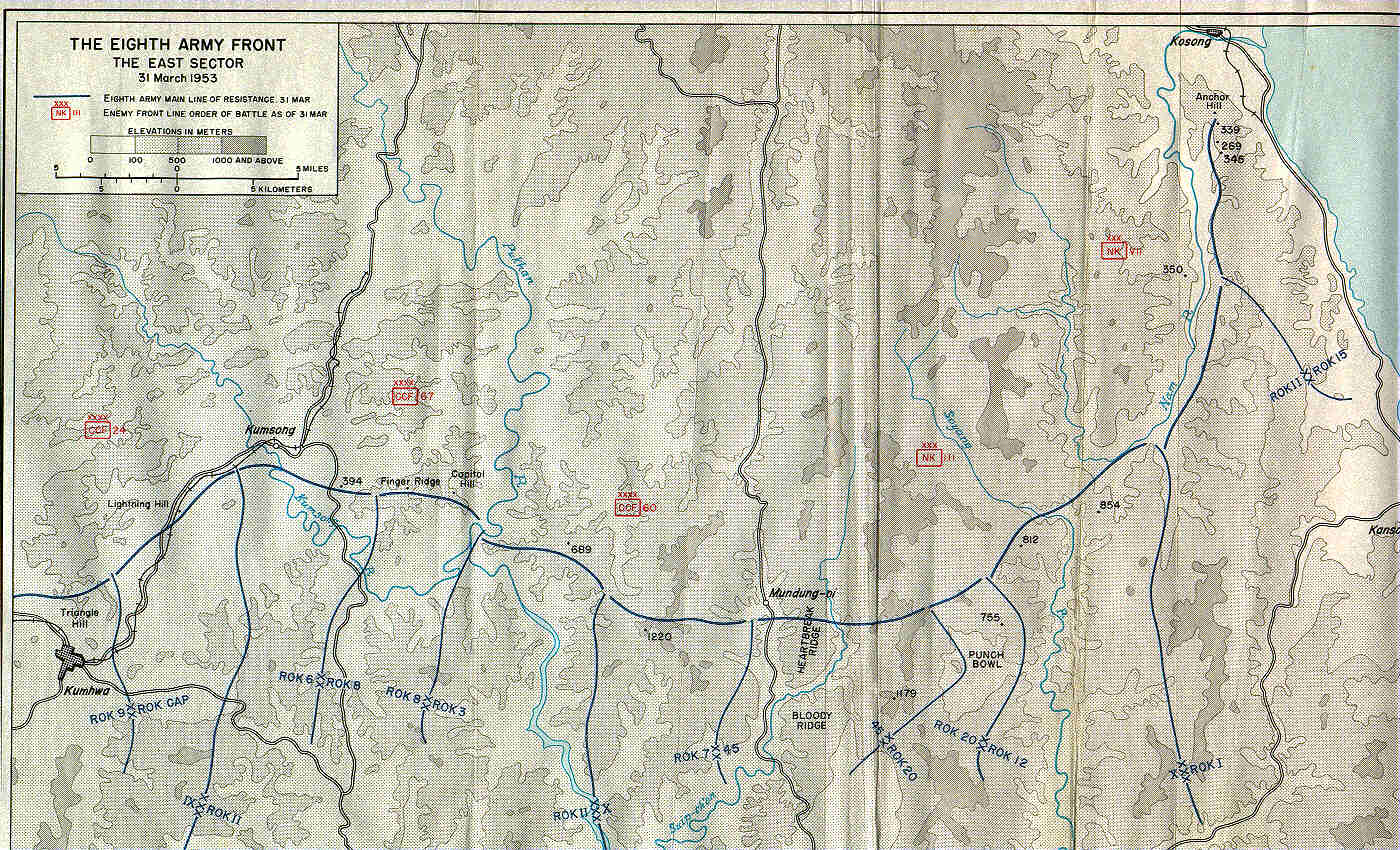
Jamestown Line east sector, 31 March 1953

The Jamestown Line was a series of defensive positions occupied by United Nations forces in the Korean War. Following the end of the 1951 Chinese Spring Offensive and the UN May-June 1951 counteroffensive, the war largely became one of attrition and trench warfare, fought along static defensive lines reminiscent of the First World War. As a consequence, major UN ground operations from late spring—under the direction of Lieutenant General Matthew Ridgway—were primarily conducted to recapture or establish durable defensive lines, including the Wyoming, Missouri, Kansas and Jamestown Lines. The Jamestown Line stretched from the Imjin River near Munsan-ni then arched northeast 35 miles (56 km) in the strategically important sector of front from the Kimpo peninsula on the Yellow Sea coast to a point east of Kumhwa.

The line was subsequently established during the UN counteroffensive between May and November 1951, just north of the 38th Parallel (38°N) during Operation Commando (1951). Held by the US I Corps, this sector was just 30 miles (48 km) from the South Korean capital, Seoul. Five UN divisions of I Corps were used in its capture, including the US 1st Cavalry Division, the US 3rd and 25th Infantry Divisions, the South Korean 1st Division and the 1st Commonwealth Division. The Jamestown Line was fought over almost continuously until the armistice on 27 July 1953; due to its strategic position, it was the scene of much heavy fighting, including the Battle of the Samichon River just hours before the armistice agreement, which ended the war.
