= 1st Commonwealth Division =

Commonwealth land forces in the Korean War

- Formation patch
- Active: July 1951–1954
- Country: United Kingdom; Canada; Australia; New Zealand; India; South Korea
- Allegiance: United Nations
- Branch: Army
- Type: Infantry
- Size: Division
- Part of: US I Corps
- Garrison/HQ: Jamestown Line
- Engagements: Korean War

Commanders
- Ceremonial chief: Elizabeth II
- Notable commanders: James Cassels; Michael West

The 1st Commonwealth Division was the military unit that commanded Commonwealth land forces in the Korean War. The division was a part of the multinational British Commonwealth Forces Korea, with infantry units of the British Army, Canadian Army and Australian Army forming the bulk of the division. Additionally, the New Zealand Army supplied artillery contingents and an Indian medical unit was also attached. As with the "Korean Augmentation To the United States Army" (KATUSA) programme, numerous South Korean troops were seconded to the Commonwealth division to make up numbers under a scheme known as "KATCOM".

== History ==
=== Background ===
Following the outbreak of the Korean War, the 27th British Commonwealth Brigade, which was the initial parent formation of Commonwealth army units in Korea, arrived in the peninsula with two British Infantry battalions in August 1950. It was reinforced by the 3rd Battalion, Royal Australian Regiment (3 RAR) in September, and by the 2nd Battalion, Princess Patricia's Canadian Light Infantry (PPCLI), in February 1951.

The brigade was subsequently re-constituted as the 28th Commonwealth Brigade in April 1951. Meanwhile, in November 1950, the brigade was joined by the 29th Independent Infantry Brigade, and in May 1951 by the 25th Canadian Infantry Brigade.

=== Formation ===
In July 1951, the infantry brigades were combined to form the 1st Commonwealth Division, wherein the unit was 58% British forces, 22% Canadian forces, 14% Australian forces, 5% New Zealander forces, and 1% Indian forces.

The 1st Commonwealth Division was part of the US I Corps, which also included the US 1st Cavalry Division, the US 3rd and 25th Infantry Divisions, and the ROK 1st Division. The division occupied the strategically important sector of front on the Jamestown Line, stretching from the Kimpo peninsula on the Yellow Sea coast to a point east of Kumhwa about 6.3 miles (10.1 km), and just 30 miles (48 km) from the South Korean capital, Seoul.

=== Dissolution ===
It was deactivated in 1954 as part of the demobilisation of forces in Korea in the aftermath of the war, being reduced to a Commonwealth Brigade Group, and from May 1956 until its final withdrawal in August 1957 to a Commonwealth Contingent of battalion strength.

== Commanders ==
- Commanding officers
  - Major-General James Cassels, 28 July 1951 – 7 September 1952
  - Major-General Michael West, 7 September 1952 – 1953
  - Major-General Horatius Murray, 1953–1954
- Divisional Commander Royal Artillery (CRA)
  - Brigadier William Pike, July 1951 – 1952
  - Brigadier Guy Gregson, 1952
- Divisional Commander Royal Engineers (CRE)
  - Colonel ECW Myers, RE
- Divisional Commander Royal Signals (CRSigs)
  - Lt Col AC Atkinson, Royal Sigs
- Divisional Commander Royal Army Service Corps (CRASC)
  - Lt Col MGM Crosby, RASC
- Assistant Director Medical Services (ADMS)
  - Col G Anderton, RAMC
- Divisional Commander Royal Army Ordnance Corps (CRAOC)
  - Lt Col MR Maclean, RAOC
  - Lt Col GJH Atkinson, RNZAOC
- Divisional Commander Royal Army Electrical and Mechanical Engineers (CREME)
  - Lt Col HG Good, REME

== Order of battle ==
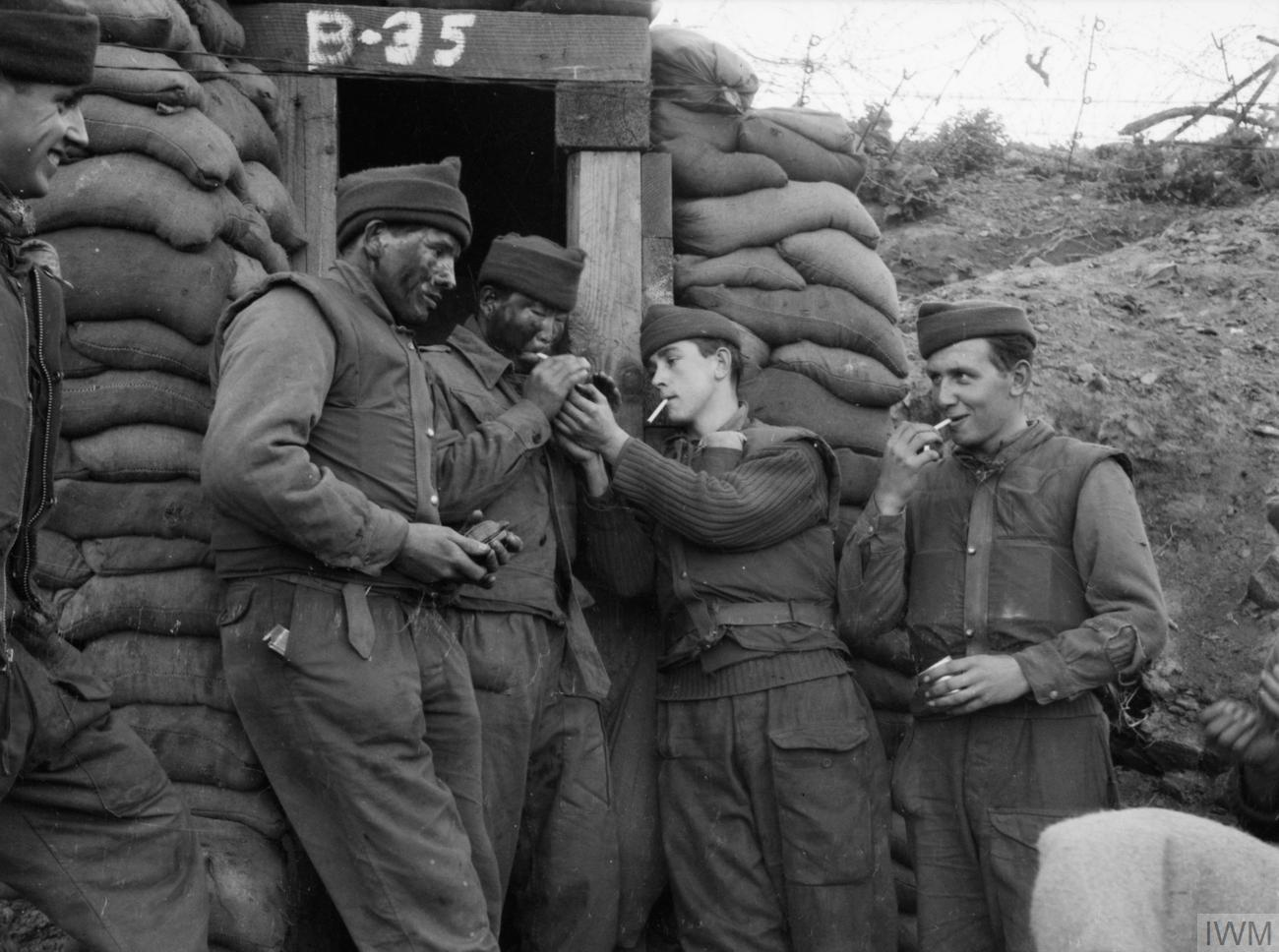
Soldiers of Duke of Wellington's Regiment the Battle of the Hook, 1953

- Headquarters and Headquarters Company 1st Commonwealth Division
  - Divisional troops
    - Signals
      - 1st Commonwealth Division Signals (July 1951–July 1953)
    - Artillery
      - 45th Field Regiment, Royal Artillery (July–November 1951) (25 pdr)
      - 11th (Sphinx) Battery, Royal Artillery (July–November 1951) (4.2 inch mortars)
      - 170th Light Battery, Royal Artillery (July–November 1951) (4.2 inch mortars)
      - 14th Field Regiment, Royal Artillery (November 1951 – December 1952) (25 pdr)
      - 120th Light AA Battery, Royal Artillery (October 1951 – December 1952) (4.2 inch mortars)
      - 42nd Light AA Battery, Royal Artillery (November 1951 – February 1952) (4.2 inch mortars)
      - 61st Light Field Regiment (January 1952 – July 1953) (4.2 inch mortars)
      - 20th Field Regiment, Royal Artillery (December 1952 – July 1953) (25 pdr)
      - 16th Field Regiment, Royal New Zealand Artillery (July 1951 – July 1953) (25 pdr)
      - 42nd Field Regiment, Royal Artillery (December 1953– ) (25 pdr)
      - 2nd Regiment, Royal Canadian Horse Artillery (July 1951 – May 1952) (25 pdr)
      - 1st Regiment, Royal Canadian Horse Artillery (May 1952 – April 1953) (25 pdr)
      - 81st Field Regiment, Royal Canadian Artillery (April 1953 – July 1953) (25 pdr)
      - 74th (Battleax Company) Medium Battery, Royal Artillery (March–November 1953) (5.5 inch medium guns)
      - 1903 Independent Air Observation Post Flight, Royal Artillery (July 1951 – July 1953)
    - Engineers
      - 28th Field Engineer Regiment, Royal Engineers (July 1951 – July 1953)
      - 64th Field Park Squadron, Royal Engineers (July 1951 – July 1953)
    - Armour
      - 8th King's Royal Irish Hussars (July 1951 – December 1951) (Centurion tank, Cromwell tank)
      - C Squadron, 7th Royal Tank Regiment (July 1951 – October 1951) (Churchill tank)
      - 5th Royal Inniskilling Dragoon Guards (December 1951 – December 1952) (Centurion tank)
      - 1st Royal Tank Regiment (December 1952 – December 1953) (Centurion tank)
      - 5th Royal Tank Regiment (December 1953 – December 1954) (Centurion tank)
      - C Squadron, Lord Strathcona's Horse (Royal Canadians) (2nd Armoured Regiment) (May 1951 – June 1952) (M4 Sherman)
      - B Squadron, Lord Strathcona's Horse (Royal Canadians) (2nd Armoured Regiment) (June 1952 – May 1953) (M4 Sherman)
      - A Squadron, Lord Strathcona's Horse (Royal Canadians) (2nd Armoured Regiment) (December 1953– ) (M4 Sherman)
    - Medical
      - 60th (Para) Indian Field Ambulance (November 1950 – August 1953)
      - 26th Field Ambulance, RAMC (December 1950–)
      - No. 25 Field Ambulance, RCAMC (May 1951 – April 1952)
      - No. 25 Canadian Field Dressing Station (July 1951–)
      - No. 37 Field Ambulance, RCAMC (April 1952 – May 1953)
      - No. 38 Field Ambulance, RCAMC (May 1953–)
    - Logistics
      - Ordnance
        - No. 25 Canadian Infantry Brigade Group Ordnance Company (May 1951 – Jan 1952)
        - 28th Commonwealth Infantry Brigade Ordnance Field Park
        - 24th British Infantry Brigade Group Ordnance Field Park
        - 1st Commonwealth Division, Stores Distribution Detachment
      - Workshops
        - 10th Infantry Workshops, REME
        - 11th Infantry Workshops, REME
        - 16th Infantry Workshops, REME
        - 25 Canadian Support Workshop, RCEME (May 1951 – Jan 1952)
        - 191 Infantry Workshop, RCEME (May 1951 – Apr 1955)
        - 40 Canadian Infantry Workshop, RCEME (Apr 1953 – Dec 1953)
        - 42 Infantry Workshop, RCEME (Mar 1955 – Feb 1955)
        - 1st Commonwealth Division, Tank Workshop
        - 1st Commonwealth Division, Signals Workshop
        - 1st Commonwealth Division, Recovery Unit
      - Transport
        - 54 Company, RCASC
        - 57 Company, RASC
        - 78 Company, RASC
        - 10 Company, RNZASC 1951–1956
    - Infantry
      - 25th Canadian Infantry Brigade
        - 1st Battalion, Royal Canadian Regiment (April 1952 – November 1953)
        - 2nd Battalion, Royal Canadian Regiment (May 1951 – April 1952)
        - 3rd Battalion, Royal Canadian Regiment (March 1953 – March 1954)
        - 1st Battalion, Princess Patricia's Canadian Light Infantry (October 1951 – November 1952)
        - 2nd Battalion, Princess Patricia's Canadian Light Infantry (December 1950 – November 1951)
        - 3rd Battalion, Princess Patricia's Canadian Light Infantry (October 1952 – October 1953)
        - 1st Battalion, Royal 22^{e} Régiment (April 1952 – April 1953)
        - 2nd Battalion, Royal 22^{e} Régiment (May 1951 – April 1952)
        - 3rd Battalion, Royal 22^{e} Régiment (April 1953 – April 1954)
      - 27th Infantry Brigade (aka 27th British Commonwealth Brigade):
        - 1st Battalion, Middlesex Regiment
        - 1st Battalion, Argyll and Sutherland Highlanders
        - 2nd Battalion, Princess Patricia's Canadian Light Infantry (December 1950 – April 1951)
        - 3rd Battalion, Royal Australian Regiment (September 1950 – April 1951)
        - 16th Field Regiment, Royal New Zealand Artillery (January 1951 – April 1951)
        - 60th Indian Field Ambulance
      - 28th Commonwealth Infantry Brigade (previously organised as 27th British Commonwealth Brigade):
        - 1st Battalion, King's Own Scottish Borderers (April 1951 – August 1952)
        - 1st Battalion, King's Shropshire Light Infantry (July 1951 – September 1952)
        - 1st Battalion, Royal Fusiliers (August 1952 – July 1953)
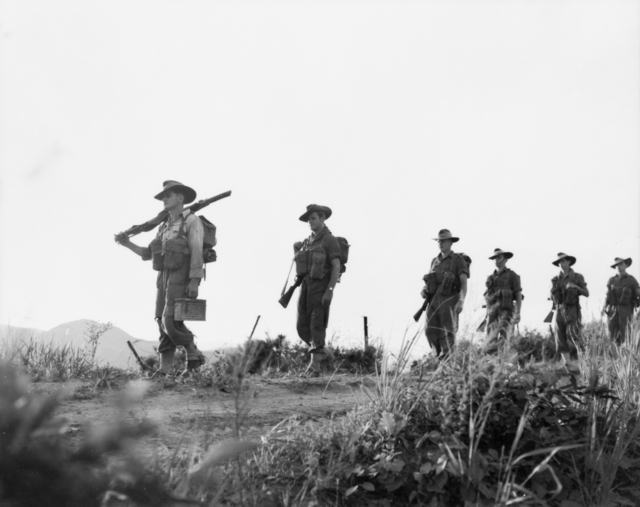
          2RAR withdraw to the DMZ Korea 1953
        - 1st Battalion, Durham Light Infantry (September 1952 – July 1953)
        - 3rd Battalion, Royal Australian Regiment (3 RAR) (July 1951 – July 1953)
        - 1st Battalion, Royal Australian Regiment (1 RAR) (June 1952 – March 1953)
        - 2nd Battalion, Royal Australian Regiment (2 RAR) (April 1953 – July 1953)
      - 29th Infantry Brigade (previously organised as 29th Independent Infantry Brigade):
        - 1st Battalion, Royal Northumberland Fusiliers (July 1951 – October 1951)
        - 1st Battalion, Gloucestershire Regiment (July 1951 – November 1951)
        - 1st Battalion, Royal Ulster Rifles (July 1951 – October 1951)
        - 1st Battalion, Royal Norfolk Regiment (October 1951 – September 1952)
        - 1st Battalion, Royal Leicestershire Regiment (October 1951 – June 1952)
        - 1st Battalion, Welch Regiment (November 1951 – November 1952)
        - 1st Battalion, Black Watch (June 1952 – July 1953)
        - 1st Battalion, King's Regiment (Liverpool) (September 1952 – July 1953)
        - 1st Battalion, Duke of Wellington's Regiment (September 1952 – July 1953)
        - 1st Battalion, Royal Scots (July 1953)
