= Léo Major =

Canadian soldier (1921–2008)

Léo Major DCM & Bar
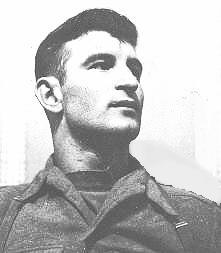
- Major in 1944
- Born: January 23, 1921; New Bedford, Massachusetts, U.S.
- Died: October 12, 2008 (aged 87); Candiac, Quebec, Canada
- Burial place: National Field of Honour
- Spouse: Pauline De Croiselle (m. 1951)
- Children: 4
- Relatives: Aimé Major (cousin)
- Military career
- Allegiance: Canada
- Branch: Canadian Army
- Service years: 1940–1945; 1950–1953
- Rank: Sergeant
- Units: Régiment de la Chaudière; Royal 22^{e} Régiment
- Conflicts: World War II; Invasion of Normandy; Battle of the Scheldt; Liberation of Zwolle; Korean War; First Battle of Maryang San
- Awards: Distinguished Conduct Medal and bar

Léo Major DCM & Bar (January 23, 1921 – October 12, 2008) was a Canadian soldier who was the only Canadian and one of only three soldiers in the British Commonwealth to receive the Distinguished Conduct Medal (DCM) twice in separate wars.

Major earned his first DCM in World War II in 1945 after a successful reconnaissance mission during the liberation of the Dutch city of Zwolle. As he was sent to scout the city with one of his best friends, a firefight broke out in which his friend was killed. Major continued on to find that Zwolle was mostly deserted by the German occupational army. Thanks to his efforts, the city was spared the artillery fire that was planned the next day by the Allies. He received his second DCM during the Korean War for leading the capture of a key hill in 1951.

== Life ==
Major was born on January 23, 1921, in New Bedford, Massachusetts, United States, to French Canadian parents. He moved with his family to Montreal before his first birthday. Due to a poor relationship with his father, he moved to live with an aunt at age 14. Major joined the Canadian army in 1940 to prove to his father that he was "somebody to be proud of."

He was a cousin to singer Aimé Major.

=== Second World War ===
Major was serving with the Régiment de la Chaudière, which landed on Juno beach in the Invasion of Normandy on June 6, 1944, also known as D-Day. During a reconnaissance mission on D-Day, Major captured a German halftrack by himself, killing all of the halftrack soldiers. The vehicle contained German communication equipment and secret codes, whose possession was critical to Allied intelligence.

Days later, during his first encounter with an SS patrol, he killed four soldiers. However, one of them managed to ignite a phosphorus grenade; in the resulting explosion, Major lost one eye but continued to fight. He continued his service as a scout and a sniper by insisting he needed only one eye to sight his weapon. According to him, he "looked like a pirate".

==== Battle of the Scheldt ====
Major single-handedly captured 93 German soldiers during the Battle of the Scheldt in Zeeland in the southern Netherlands. According to the Ottawa Citizen, Major and his friend, Corporal Wilfrid Arsenault, were assigned to determine the fates of a company of recruits that had disappeared after being sent to capture a town; however, as Arsenault fell ill, Major went alone. After finding the company's abandoned equipment and determining they had been captured, Major entered a house to find shelter from the rain and the cold, when he spotted two German soldiers walking along a dike. He captured the first German, used him as bait to capture the other, and brought his captives to their commanding officer; the officer and his company, totaling around 100 men, surrendered, though three of the soldiers were killed by Major. In a nearby group of houses, SS troops, witnessing the company surrender, opened fire on them, killing seven and injuring some others. Major disregarded the enemy fire and continued escorting his prisoners to the Canadian front line, ordering a passing Canadian tank to fire on the SS troops. He marched back to camp with the surviving 93 prisoners.

Allegedly, Major was chosen to receive a Distinguished Conduct Medal. However, he declined the offer as, according to him, General Montgomery (who was to present him with the award) was "incompetent" and in no position to be giving out medals. Whether he actually got this nomination and why he would not have received it is not clear; The National Archives only contains records of his later DCM recommendation from 1945. An article in Dutch newspaper Trouw claims he received seven days off instead, which he spent in Belgium, and that he was not present to receive his DCM because his car would not start. However, Dirk Staat, conservator of the Dutch Nationaal Militair Museum, has done research on Major for two years and doubts the usual telling of the events, arguing that there were no reports of a DCM recommendation and that one person escorting 93 prisoners is unfathomably difficult:

"Those stories are indeed doing the rounds, that he also received a medallion for the Battle of the Scheldt, the Distinguished Conduct Medal. He would have captured 93 soldiers there. He refused [the medal] because of General Montgomery. But you cannot find anything about all of that. Major fought in Zeeland, and undoubtedly he would have been competent. But about his medal we read nothing. And do not be mistaken; if someone came ten minutes too late to the evening roll call, then that is in the reports. Or that they get new shoes on Tuesday. And then there would be nothing noted down about the medal for Major? Would be really weird, I cannot imagine that."

In February 1945, Major was helping a military chaplain load corpses from a destroyed Tiger II tank into a Universal Carrier in Keppeln, Germany. After they finished, the chaplain and the driver seated themselves in the front while Major jumped in the back of the vehicle. The carrier struck a land mine, the resulting explosion killing the chaplain and the driver and knocking Major unconscious. Major claimed to have remembered a loud blast, followed by his body being thrown into the air and smashing down hard on his back. Upon regaining consciousness, he awoke to find two concerned medical officers trying to assess his condition. He simply asked if the chaplain was okay. They did not answer his question, but transported him on a truck to a field hospital 30 miles (48 km) away, stopping every 15 minutes to inject morphine to relieve the pain in his back.

==== Liberation of Zwolle ====
Liberation of Zwolle
- Part of World War II
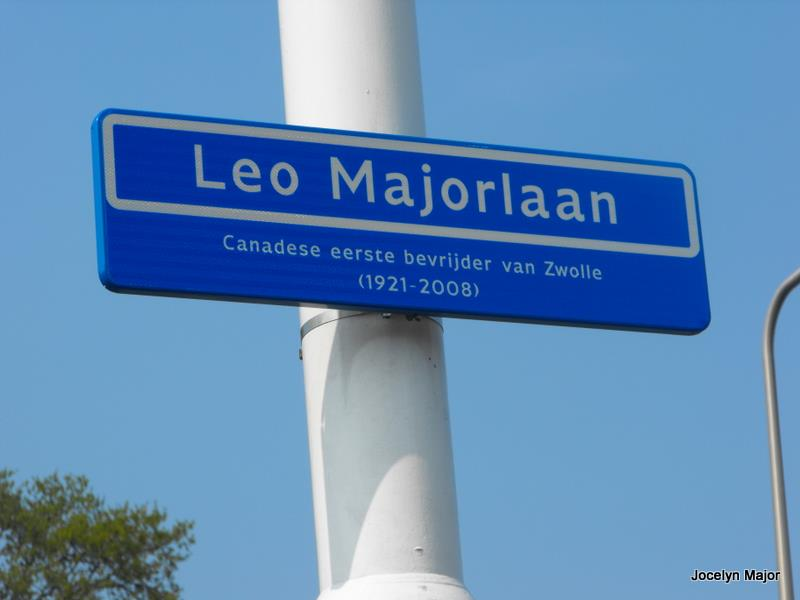
- Leo Majorlaan (Léo Major Avenue) street sign in the Dutch city of Zwolle. The text reads: Canadian first liberator of Zwolle (1921–2008)
Date	April 13, 1945
Location	Zwolle, Netherlands
Result	Canadian victory

Belligerents
Canada	Germany

Commanders and leaders
Léo Major; Wilfrid Arsenault †	Unknown

Units involved
Régiment de la Chaudière	Gestapo; Waffen-SS; Wehrmacht

Strength
2	1,000

Casualties and losses
1	Unknown, at least 2 confirmed casualties

At the beginning of April 1945, the Régiment de la Chaudière were approaching the city of Zwolle, which was shown to have strong German resistance. On April 13, the regiment's commanding officer asked for two volunteers for a reconnaissance mission into Zwolle, their tasks being to scout the German force and, if possible, make contact with the Dutch Resistance, before an Allied artillery barrage could commence. Private Major and Corporal Arsenault stepped forward to accept the task. However, Major and Arsenault, wanting to spare the city from destruction, agreed to attempt to liberate the city themselves.

That night, Major and Arsenault entered the farmhouse of Hendrik van Gerner, who gave them rough positions of German emplacements near the railway tracks. After leaving the farmhouse, Arsenault was killed by German fire after accidentally giving away the pair's position. In a radio interview with RTV Zwolle, Major told that he became mad after that, but managed to control himself. Major killed two of the Germans, but the rest fled in a vehicle. Deciding to continue his mission alone, Major entered Zwolle near Sassenpoort.

What happened after that is unclear. Stories about Major's actions in Zwolle have been exaggerated and conflated with his other deeds, and there are several conflicting accounts of what actually happened, including several contradictory accounts from Major himself. However, what is certain is that Major spent several hours in Zwolle, the German military left the city, Major contacted the Dutch resistance, and he returned to camp with Arsenault's body.

Thanks to Major's efforts, the planned shelling of Zwolle was called off, and the Régiment de la Chaudière entered the city the next day without firing a single shot. For his actions, Major received the Distinguished Conduct Medal.

=== Differing accounts of Major's actions ===
The most popular and oft-cited story claims that Major, armed with several machine guns and a sack of grenades, launched a solo assault on Zwolle, using gunfire and grenade explosions to trick the German elements in the city into believing a large Canadian force was assaulting the city; after Major had killed several German soldiers and made contact with the resistance the German force fled, and Major returned to camp to report his findings to the commanding officer of the Chaudières. Certain versions of the story add or change details of what Major encountered in the city, such as him taking the driver of a German military vehicle hostage or assaulting the local SS headquarters. According to Major's official recommendation for the Distinguished Conduct Medal, written 20 May 1945:

To save as many Dutch lives as possible, it was necessary to know exactly the location of the enemy positions, many of which were not known. Private Leo Major and a Corporal Wilfred Arsenault from the scout platoon volunteered to enter the town and contact the underground movement to obtain the necessary information. At the entrance of the town, was a roadblock guarded by a small group of enemy. The patrol was discovered and the Corporal killed. Pte. Major killed two Germans and scattered the others. Undaunted by the death of a friend and comrade, he continued to patrol alone for 6 hours, contacting the underground and formed patrols of the local Dutch civilians, with the result that by morning the enemy garrison menaced from inside and from outside, were forced to withdraw as their position became untenable. To urge them on Pte. Major had the Gestapo headquarters set on fire. At 0400 hours 14 April 1945, this gallant soldier waded across a canal, after posting numerous patrols of the Dutch Resistance Movement at strategic points. On his way back, though wet and tired, he picked up the body of his Corporal and brought it in.

According to an article written after Major's death from the Canadian Army Journal, Vol. 11.3 Fall 2008:

Major was carrying two Sten guns and a sack of grenades. He arrived in the centre of Zwolle at about 0100 hours and found the streets silent and deserted. Here, he spotted a German machine-gun nest which, since the crew was sleeping, he promptly attacked and eliminated. He then found a German scout car and forced one of the Germans, who he had captured, to drive through the streets with the lights on, flying a white flag. For several hours, Major moved through the streets in this manner, shooting at any target he could find, making an impression that a large Canadian force had arrived. The citizens were awakened but were afraid to come out of their houses. By a stroke of luck, Private Major came across the head of the local resistance, Frits Kuipers, and three of his men. By now the Germans appeared to have fled the city in panic. The group therefore returned to the town hall and the resistance fighters brought the citizens out into the streets. The local radio station was used to announce that the town had been liberated. Major was exhausted but he had to complete his mission by bringing back the body of his comrade, Wilfrid Arsenault, to his lines. The resistance fighters arranged for a car to transport the body back, but were fired on by outposts of the Chaudières. Major was furious and climbed onto the top of the car so that he could be easily seen from a distance. In this manner, he returned to the Canadian lines to report the result of his mission to his commanding officer.

A similar version from a 2005 article from the Ottawa Citizen claims that Major "worked his way to the city centre", captured the driver of a German staff car outside a tavern, went inside the tavern with this captive, and disarmed the officer who was drinking inside. The two communicated in French, and Major learned the officer was from Alsace-Lorraine, "a region near France that was not terribly committed to Adolf Hitler's rabid designs"; finding the officer did not mean any harm, Major gave the officer his gun back: "I said the war is almost finished and I am a member of the advance party – I didn't say I was alone. I said it's a lovely town and I didn't want nobody to destroy that town." Major then "spent the next few hours engaging patrols whenever he could and setting off grenades where they would make noise, but do little damage", and killed four SS members during an attack on the local SS headquarters. By four in the morning, Major learned the Germans had left the city, and tried to signal the townsfolk to come outside; however, he found that this was difficult, as they were unsure of who he was. Linking up with the resistance, Major returned to camp with Arsenault's body. The Dutch newspaper Trouw offers a much less fantastical account of Major's actions, presenting the "solo assault" story as a legend that Major entertained and that the actual operation was much more simple, as the Germans had already mostly left:

He reached the city and walked through deserted streets. He knocked on doors, but nobody dared to open the doors. "After a while I was so tired that I couldn't think straight anymore. But I had enough information, and I encountered enemies nowhere." He walked around in circles, left the town and came to a farmer whom he reassured by pointing at the word CANADA in the inside of his hat. Quickly he came in contact with the underground resistance. He was able to return to his unit with the message that the enemy left Zwolle. ... But in the decades that followed Leo Major became a 'Rambo' who according to many conquered street after street wildly shooting around on 'certainly a thousand' Germans who persistently resisted. It was a story that he – so his friends mildly laugh – in the end started to believe a little bit himself.

A 2017 article in Jonge Historici offers a similar account, stating that Major simply "walked through deserted streets and established contact with the underground resistance. After that he returned to his regiment, where at 9 o'clock he reported that the enemy had left the city."

Similarly, in an interview with De Stentor, Nationaal Militair Museum curator Dirk Staat, who had researched Major for two years, argued that much of the popularly-accepted story is a myth with no records or proof of any incident happening that night in Zwolle. Staat also believes the vehicle used by Major was not a hijacked German military vehicle, but rather just the car of the head of the local resistance, Frits Kuiper, which Major also used to ride back in the morning.

Descriptions of him setting the city on fire like Rambo, while he was shooting around him and threw grenades through the city; I don't think that is the right image. We have read police reports about that night, and within we read nothing about the unrest. ... The Germans [Major] saw, would have been the tail end of the retreating occupation. ... [Setting the building on fire] fits the modus operandi of the retreating Germans. They kill prisoners and destroy dossiers. And what is more effective to destroy dossiers, than to set the building on fire?

A radio programme about Léo Major by RTV Zwolle agrees with Staat's argument that the Germans set fire to the house on the Potgietersingel, where the German police held office, to destroy their documents. The programme included an interview with Major, who described the events of the night. He stated the first thing he did was go to the railroad station, because he "thought that's where the Germans would come in", and he had "heard from Hendriks van Gerner that some of the bridges were destroyed." He entered the city through the Sassenpoort. All the people he met "were either collaborators or German. And the German I met, most of them were drunk." He made noise using grenades and machine gun fire, and believed the noises he made startled the Germans into fleeing.

=== Korean War ===
After the conclusion of World War II, Major returned to his former job as a pipe fitter. He also underwent surgery to fix his back, which had bothered him since the landmine explosion in February 1945.

When the Korean War broke out, the Canadian government raised a force to join the United Nations Command in repelling the communist invasion. Major was called back and ended up in the Scout and Sniper Platoon of 2nd Battalion Royal 22^{e} Régiment (R22^{e}R) of the 25th Canadian Infantry Brigade, 1st Commonwealth Division. Major fought in the First Battle of Maryang-san, where he received a bar to his Distinguished Conduct Medal for capturing and holding a key hill in November 1951.

==== Second Distinguished Conduct Medal ====
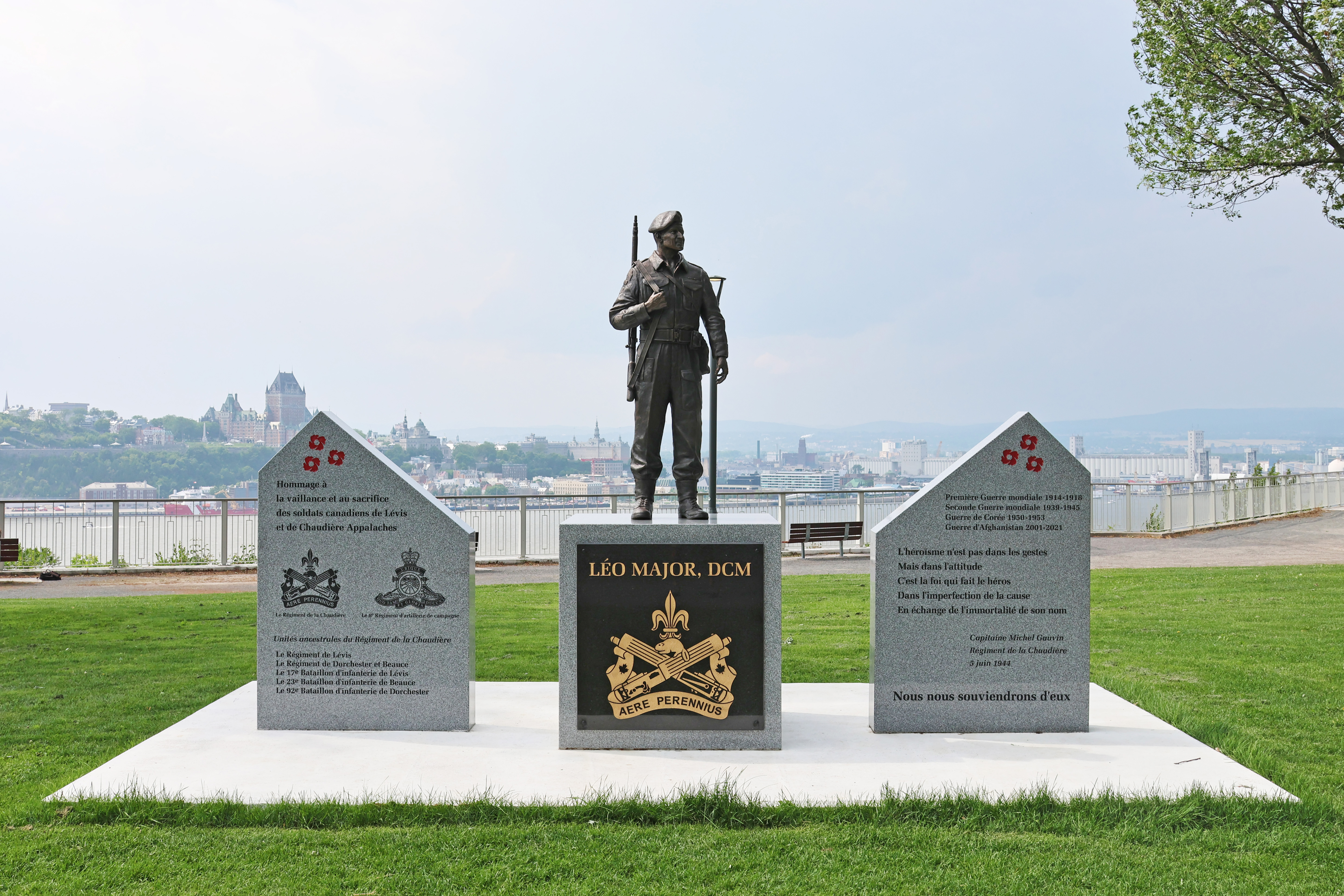
Monument dedicated to Léo Major, Lévis, Quebec

Hill 355, nicknamed Little Gibraltar, was a strategic feature, commanding the terrain for twenty miles around, so the Communists were determined to take it before the truce talks came to an agreement that would lock each side into their present positions. Hill 355 was held by the 3rd U.S. Infantry Division, who linked up with the R22^{e}R on the Americans' western flank. On November 22, the Chinese 64th Army (around 40,000 men) began their attack: over the course of two days, the Americans were pushed back from Hill 355 by elements of the Chinese 190th and 191st Divisions. The 3rd U.S. Infantry Division tried to recapture the hill, but without any success, and the Chinese had moved to the nearby Hill 227, practically surrounding the Canadian forces.

To relieve pressure, an elite scout and sniper team led by Léo Major was brought up. Armed with Sten guns, Major and his 18 men, wearing running shoes to silence their movements, passed through enemy lines and crept up Hill 227 from the Chinese side. At a signal, Major's men opened fire, panicking the Chinese who were trying to understand why the enemy's fire was coming from the centre of their troops instead of from the outside. By 12:45 am, Major's team had retaken the hill. However, an hour later, the 190th and the 191st, totalling around 14,000 men, launched a counter-attack. Major was ordered to retreat, but refused and found scant cover for his men. He held the enemy off throughout the night, though they were so close to him that Major's own mortar bombs were practically falling on him. The commander of the mortar platoon, Captain Charly Forbes, later wrote that Major was "an audacious man ... not satisfied with the proximity of my barrage and asks to bring it closer...In effect, my barrage falls so close that I hear my bombs explode when he speaks to me on the radio." Major and his platoon held Hill 227 for three days until relieved by the U.S. 3rd Infantry Division.

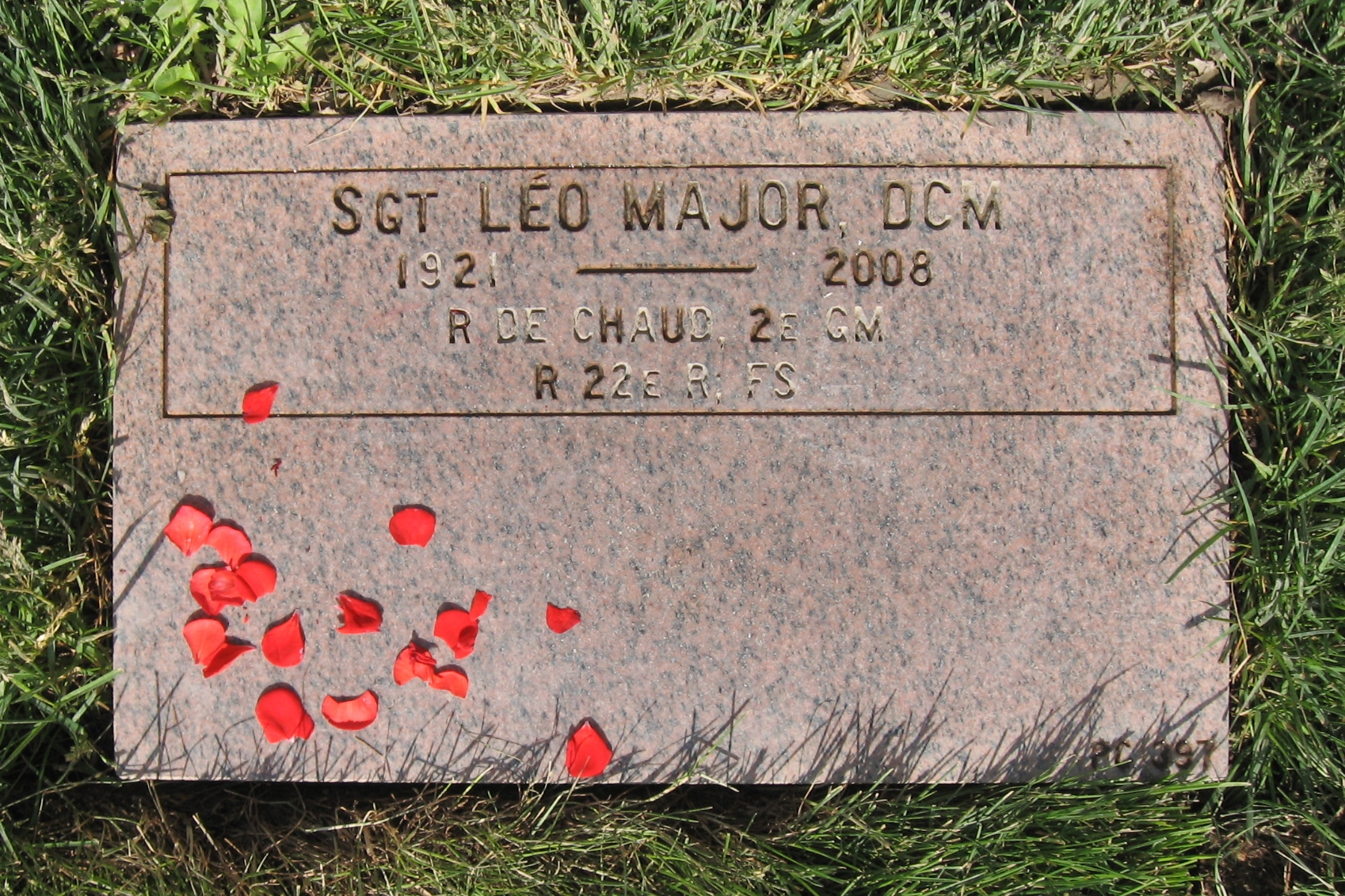
Léo Major's headstone at Last Post Fund National Field of Honour, Pointe-Claire, Canada

== Death and legacy ==
Major died in Candiac, Quebec, on October 12, 2008 and was buried at the Last Post Fund National Field of Honour in Pointe-Claire. He was survived by Pauline De Croiselle, his wife of 57 years; four children; and five grandchildren. A documentary film about his exploits, Léo Major, le fantôme borgne, was produced in Montreal in 2018. He was also portrayed in the short 2025 documentary Léo Major: One Man Army. To commemorate the 75th anniversary of Victory in Europe, Canada Post issued a stamp in honour of Major, "The one-eyed ghost", on April 29, 2020. The Canadian band Mystery released the song "Pearls and Fire" about Major on their 2023 album Redemption. The story of Leo Major was also featured in Season 3, episode 6 of Hitler's Last Stand on National Geographic .

== Honours ==

Ribbon	Description	Notes
	Distinguished Conduct Medal (DCM)	With Bar
	1939–1945 Star	
	France and Germany Star	
	Defence Medal	
	Canadian Volunteer Service Medal	With Overseas Clasp
	War Medal	
	Korea Medal	
	Canadian Volunteer Service Medal for Korea	
	United Nations Korea Medal	With "KOREA" Clasp

- He was awarded honorary citizenship of the City of Zwolle, Netherlands, on 14 April 2005.
