= 64th Group Army =

Chinese military unit

64th Corps (1949-60) 64th Army Corps (1960-85) 64th Army (1985-98)
- Chinese: 第64集团军
- Active: 1949.1-1998 (inactive)
- Country: China
- Part of: Shenyang Military Region
- Garrison/HQ: Benxi, Liaoning
- Engagements: Chinese Civil War, Korean War, Vietnam War, Sino-Soviet border conflict

Commanders
- Notable commanders: Chen Zhengxiang

The 64th Group Army (Chinese: 第64集团军), former 64th Corps and 64th Army Corps, was a military formation of China's People's Liberation Army that existed from 1949 to 1998.

== Chinese Civil War and Korean War ==
The 64th Corps (Chinese: 第64军) was created in January 1949 under the Regulation of the Redesignations of All Organizations and Units of the Army, issued by the Central Military Commission on 1 November 1948, based on the 4th Column of the Jinchaji Military Region. Its lineage could be traced to the Jizhong Column, formed in 1945.

As of its formation, the Corps was composed by 3 divisions: the 190th, 191st and 192nd.

The Corps was part of the 19th Army Group. It took part in many battles, especially the Pingjin Campaign during the Chinese Civil War.

In October 1950, Artillery Regiment, 64th Corps activated. In February 1951 the regiment was renamed the 171st Artillery Regiment. In January 1951, the corps was re-equipped with Soviet-built small arms.

In February 1951, the Corps entered Korea with all its subordinated divisions as a part of the P eople's Volunteer Army. During its deployment in Korea, it took part in the Fifth Phase Offensive, during which the corps suffered heavy losses by indirect fire at the riverbank of Imjin River, but made significant territorial gains against the confronting U.S. 24th Infantry Division.

During the First Battle of Maryang San in November 1951, Hill 355, nicknamed Little Gibraltar, was a strategic feature, commanding the terrain for twenty miles around, so the Communists were determined to take it before the truce talks came to an agreement that would lock each side into their present positions.

Hill 355 was held by the 3rd U.S. Infantry Division, who linked up with the Canadian Royal 22nd Regiment on the Americans' western flank. On November 22, the 64th Army (around 40,000 men) began their attack: over the course of two days, the Americans were pushed back from Hill 355 by elements of the Chinese 190th and 191st Divisions. The 3rd U.S. Infantry Division tried to recapture the hill, but without any success, and the Chinese had moved to the nearby Hill 227, practically surrounding the Canadian forces. A raid led by experienced Canadian non-commissioned officer Léo Major was mounted to relieve the pressure.

== Port Arthur ==
In August 1953 the corps pulled out of Korea and was stationed in Fengcheng, Liaoning, and later moved to Andong, Liaoning.

In February 1955, as Soviet 39th Army withdrawing from the Port Arthur area, PLA 63rd Corps, with all its three divisions and reinforced by 170th Artillery Regiment from 63rd Corps; Independent Tank Regiment of Huabei Military Region, and 1st Public Security Division, moved into Port Arthur to receive equipment left by the Soviet Army.

- 190th Infantry Division, reinforced by Independent Tank Regiment of Huabei Military Region and 170th Artillery Regiment, received equipment from Soviet 7th Mechanized Division, stationed in Xiajiahezi;
- 191st Infantry Division received equipment from 17th Guards Rifle Division, stationed in Jinzhou District;
- 192nd Infantry Division received equipment from 19th Guards Rifle Division, stationed in Lüshunkou District.
- 1st Public Security Division, reinforced with Independent Regiment of the People's Volunteer Army and the 16th Independent Anti-Aircraft Artillery Battalion, received equipment from 25th Guards Machine-Gun Artillery Division, and became the 1st Machine-gun Artillery Division. The division was then temporarily attached to the 64th Corps.

After the relieving, the 190th Infantry Division, now the 1st Mechanized Division (1st formation), detached from the corps. In March 1953, the 21st Railway Security Division joined the corps and was renamed as the 190th Infantry Division(2nd formation).

In 1955, the 171st Artillery Regiment and the 89th Anti-Aircraft Artillery Regiment were activated.

In June 1956, the 1st Machine-gun Artillery Division detached from the corps.

== 64th Army Corps ==
In April 1960, the corps was renamed the 64th Army Corps (Chinese: 陆军第64军). The corps was then composed of:

- Corps Headquarter
- 171st Artillery Regiment
- 89th Anti-Aircraft Artillery Regiment
- 190th Army Division
  - 568th Infantry Regiment
  - 569th Infantry Regiment
  - 570th Infantry Regiment
  - 570th Artillery Regiment
- 191st Army Division
  - 571st Infantry Regiment
  - 572nd Infantry Regiment
  - 573rd Infantry Regiment
  - 571st Artillery Regiment
  - 396th Tank Self-Propelled Artillery Regiment
- 192nd Army Division
  - 574th Infantry Regiment
  - 575th Infantry Regiment
  - 576th Infantry Regiment
  - 572nd Artillery Regiment
  - 397th Tank Self-Propelled Artillery Regiment

In March 1961, the 190th Army Division(2nd formation) was disbanded.

In August 1961, the 1st Mechanized Division, now known as the 190th Army Division (3rd formation), rejoined the army corps.

In June 1963, the army corps moved to Benxi, Liaoning.

== Vietnam War and Zhenbao Island ==
From January to August 1968, anti-aircraft artillery detachments from the Army Corps moved to North Vietnam to take part in the Vietnam War. During its deployment in Vietnam, the unit allegedly shot down four (4) USAF aircraft and damaged three(3):

- On 15–16 March, Anti-Aircraft Artillery Battalion, 192nd Army Division (reinforced with 4th Battery, Anti-Aircraft Artillery Regiment, 64th Army Corps) shot down 2 F-4C/F-105 fighters and damaged other 3;
- On 28 March, Anti-Aircraft Artillery Battalion, 191st Army Division shot down two F-4C fighters.

However, none of these claims could be confirmed by U.S. sources.

From November 1968 to May 1970, Reconnaissance Company, 190th Army Division, Reconnaissance Company, 191st Army Division, and 57 mm Recoilless Rifle Company, Artillery Battalion, 572nd Infantry Regiment, 191st Army Division were deployed to Zhenbao Island for up-coming border conflict with the Soviet Army. However, the composite unit did not take part in direct engagement.

In January 1976, the 3rd Independent Tank Regiment of Shenyang Military Region joined the army corps as Tank Regiment, 64th Army Corps.

In 1983, the 62nd Artillery Division and 82nd Pontoon Bridge Regiment were attached to the army corps.

== 64th Army ==
In September 1985, the army corps was renamed as 64th Army(Chinese: 陆军第64集团军), and its structure was completely re-organized:

- The 62nd Artillery Division and the 82nd Pontoon Bridge Regiment were detached from the army.
- All army divisions were renamed as infantry divisions.
- 190th Infantry Division was classified as northern motorized infantry division, catalogue A; one of its three infantry regiments was mechanized, and all three infantry regiments had tank battalions.
- 191st and 192nd Infantry Divisions were classified as northern infantry division, catalogue B.
- Tank Brigade, 64th Army was activated from Tank Regiment, 64th Army Corps.
- Artillery Brigade, 64th Army was activated from Artillery Regiment, 64th Army Corps.
- Anti-Aircraft Artillery Brigade, 64th Army was activated from AAA Regiment, 64th Army Corps.
- Engineer Regiment was activated.
- Communications Regiment was activated.

In summer 1989, 190th Infantry Division took part in the enforced martial law and the crackdown on protests in Beijing, without suffering casualties.

In 1992, 1st Anti-Aircraft Artillery Brigade (62nd Artillery Division before 1985), 82nd Pontoon Bridge Regiment and 10th Engineer Regiment were attached to the army, the former Anti-Aircraft Artillery Brigade, 64th Army, and Engineer Regiment, 64th Army were disbanded. Outer Changshan Garrison Division and 2nd Garrison Brigade of Shenyang Military Region(later Coastal Defense Regiment of Shenyang Military Region) were also attached.

== Disbandment ==
In 1998 the army was disbanded.

- 190th Motorized Infantry Division were transferred to 39th Army;
- 191st Infantry Division were reduced to a brigade and transferred to Liaoning Provincial Military District;
- 192nd Infantry Division was inactivated and became a reserve formation;
- Outer Changshan Garrison District (former garrison division) and Coastal Defense Regiment of Shenyang Military Region were also transferred to Liaoning Provincial Military District's control;
- Tank Brigade, 64th Army, along with other formations, were disbanded.

As of its disbandment, the army was composed of:

- Army Headquarter
- Engineer Regiment
- Communications Regiment
- 82nd Pontoon Bridge Regiment
- 190th Motorized Infantry Division
  - 568th Infantry Regiment
  - 569th Infantry Regiment
  - 570th Infantry Regiment
  - Tank Regiment
  - Artillery Regiment
  - Anti-Aircraft Artillery Regiment
- 191st Infantry Division
  - 571st Infantry Regiment
  - 572nd Infantry Regiment
  - 573rd Infantry Regiment
  - Artillery Regiment
- 192nd Infantry Division
  - 574th Infantry Regiment
  - 575th Infantry Regiment
  - 576th Infantry Regiment
  - Artillery Regiment
- Outer Changshan Garrison District
- Coastal Defense Regiment of Shenyang Military Region
- Tank Brigade
- Artillery Brigade
- Anti-Aircraft Artillery Brigade

== Notable commanders ==
- Zeng Siyu
- Ge Zhenfeng
