= 191st Brigade =

191st Brigade may refer to:

- 191st Motorized Infantry Brigade, People's Republic of China
- 191st (2nd Seaforth and Cameron Highlanders) Brigade, United Kingdom
- 191st Infantry Brigade (United States)

== See also ==
- 191st Regiment (disambiguation)
