= 190th Brigade =

190th Brigade may refer to:

- 190th Mechanized Infantry Brigade, People's Republic of China
- 190th Brigade (United Kingdom)
- 190th (2nd Durham Light Infantry) Brigade, United Kingdom
- 190th Infantry Brigade (United States)

== See also ==
- 190th Regiment (disambiguation)
