= 190th Division (2nd Formation) (People's Republic of China) =

Former Chinese military unit

21st Public Security Division (1951-55) 190th Infantry Division (1955–61)
- Active: 1951.1 - 1961.1
- Country: People's Republic of China
- Branch: People's Liberation Army
- Type: Division
- Role: Infantry
- Part of: 64th Corps
- Garrison/HQ: Pulandian, Liaoning province

The 21st Public Security Division(Chinese: 公安第21师) was created in January 1951 from 3 security regiments of Shandong Military District and a regiment from Shangqiu Military Sub-district.

The division was composed of three regiments, with a total of 7221 personnel:

- 61st Public Security Regiment;
- 62nd Public Security Regiment;
- 63rd Public Security Regiment.

The division was a part of Railway Public Security Forces, guarding the railway lines and complexes in northern China area.

In January 1955, the division moved to Pulandian, Liaoning. In March the division was attached to 64th Corps and renamed as 190th Infantry Division(Chinese: 步兵第190师) following the 1st formation of 190th Infantry Division's re-designation.

The division was then composed of:

- 568th Infantry Regiment (former 61st Public Security);
- 569th Infantry Regiment (former 62nd Public Security);
- 570th Infantry Regiment (former 63rd Public Security);
- 570th Artillery Regiment.

In 1960, the division was disbanded following 1st Mechanized Division's re-attachment to the Army Corps.

- The divisional HQ and its 568th Infantry Regiment were re-organized as Air Force Engineering Academy;
- Its 569th Infantry Regiment was converted to 129th Engineer Construction Regiment
- 570th Infantry Regiment was transferred to Jilin Provincial Military District, later expanded to 213th Army Division;
- 570th Artillery Regiment was transferred to Lvda Security District's control.
