= Aimé Major =

Canadian singer-songwriter and actor (1924/1926–1996)

- Born: February 7, 1924 or 1926; Montreal, Quebec, Canada
- Died: June 9, 1996 (aged 70 or 72); Montreal, Quebec, Canada
- Occupations: Singer-songwriter; actor
- Relatives: Léo Major (cousin)

Aimé Major (February 7, 1924 or 1926 – June 9, 1996) was a Canadian singer-songwriter and actor.

== Biography ==
Major was born in Montreal, Quebec, Canada on 7 February 1924 or 7 February 1926. His father was a singer and his mother was a pianist. He was a cousin to Canadian Army soldier Léo Major.

Aimé Major studied singing, notably with Albert Cornellier and Ria Lensenns, then theater at the Conservatoire Lasalle. He had his radio debut in 1947 in the show Horizons dorés. In 1948, he won the first prize at the competition show Les talents de chez nous (Radio-Canada).

From 1949 to 1953, Major sang with the Variétés lyriques in numerous operettas including Le voyage en Chine, Balalaïka, La Margoton du bataillon and La vie parisienne. During this period, he was the star of the radio show Aimé Major chante. He was an actor with the Compagnons de Saint-Laurent in the plays La dame de l'aube, Le bourgeois gentilhomme, Le malade imaginaire, Roméo et Juliette et Le voyage de monsieur Perrichon. In 1952, he played in Shakespeare's Henri V at the Festival of Stratford, in Ontario. He was invited to the Edinburgh Festival with other members of the Théâtre du Nouveau Monde troupe.

In the mid-1950s, Major turned to pop songs. He was a regular guest on variety shows and from 1959 to 1967 released the successful ballads on disc "Un train bleu dans la nuit". "Tu m’as donné (Merci mon Dieu)", "Maman", "Je reviendrai" and "J'avais 20 ans". He hosted the show La belle époque for a few years with Margot Campbell and sang in Quebec's cabarets. He still sang in a classical style on occasions, notably with Mathé Altéry on the show L'heure du concert in 1965 and in the operetta Monsieur Beaucaire in 1969.

In the mid-1970s, Major returned to disc with religious and spiritual songs. He published a new album in 1980, and then gave recital tours in churches and seniors' residences.

Major died on June 9, 1996. In 1998, a street was named in his honor in Rock Forest–Saint-Élie–Deauville, Sherbrooke.

Major's style was similar to Michel Louvain's style.

== Discography ==
Singles
Year	Title
1957	Vole ma chanson / Oh mon Dieu
1959	Un train bleu dans la nuit / La dernière fois
1959	Tu m’as donné / Tu te souviens
1959	Chevaliers de la Table ronde / Partons, la mer est belle
1960	Maman / Comme l’amour
1961	Le tango mystérieux / Passant par Paris
1961	T’aimer, te chérir, t’adorer / Te souviens-tu
1961	L’hirondelle des faubourgs / Emmène-moi au bout du monde
1961	C’est l’amour / Je reviendrai
1962	Je Reviendrai
1962	T’es ma roue de fortune / Vague à l’âme
1963	Un jour, je rêverai / Le joueur de luth
1964	J’avais 20 ans / Un coin de ciel bleu
1964	Merci à toi Noël / Le jour de l’an
1965	Chanson de Fortunio / Tes yeux moqueurs
1966	Je n’ai pas su t’aimer / L’été des amants
1967	L’important, c’est la rose / Parce que tu es là
196?	À la claire fontaine / Chanson de l’Île-aux-Coudres / Hôtel de la Roche Pleureuse
1980	Garde au coeur l'espérance / Santa Maria de la mer

Albums
Year	Title
1960	Un souvenir d'Aimé Major
1961	Aimé Major chante l’amour
1962	Un jour, je rêverai
1964	Aimé Major
1966	La belle époque
1967	Aimé Major
1974?	Marie
1975?	Jésus et Marie
1980	Aimé Major
1995	De coeur et d'amour

== Filmography ==
Films
Year	Title
1954	Le voleur de rêves
1959	Encounter
1959	Les brûlés
1959	Il était une guerre
1972	The Doves
