= Jack Gerke =

Australian Army officer

- Born: 7 June 1916; Claremont, Western Australia
- Died: 14 February 2005 (aged 88)
- Military career
- Allegiance: Australia
- Branch: Australian Army
- Service years: 1940–1954
- Rank: Major
- Unit: 3rd Battalion, Royal Australian Regiment
- Conflicts: Second World War; Korean War; Battle of Maryang San
- Awards: Distinguished Service Order; Member of the Order of Australia

Jack Gerke, DSO, AM (7 June 1916 – 14 February 2005) was an officer in the Australian Army, serving in the Second World War and Korean War.

== Biography ==
Gerke was born in Claremont, Western Australia on 7 June 1916. During the Second World War he enlisted in the Second Australian Imperial Force (2nd AIF) on 6 August 1940. An assistant moulder before the war, he was appointed as a lieutenant in 1941 and served in the 2/16th Battalion and the 26th Battalion. Placed into the Reserve of Officers in 1947, he was promoted to captain in 1950 and served in the 3rd Battalion, Royal Australian Regiment (3 RAR) during the Korean War in 1951–52. He was awarded the Distinguished Service Order for bravery and leadership during the Battle of Maryang San in July 1951. From 1952 to 1954 he served as officer commanding No. 1 Reinforcement Holding Unit. Reaching the rank of major, he resigned from the Army in 1954. In 1976 he was appointed a Member of the Order of Australia for service to veterans. Gerke died on 14 February 2005 at the age of 88.
