= Second Battle of Maryang-san =

1951 Korean War battle

Second Battle of Maryang San
- Part of the Korean War
Date	4–6 November 1951
Location	Maryang-san, North Korea – Near Imjin River
Result	Chinese victory

Belligerents
United Nations: United Kingdom	China

Units involved
(United Kingdom) 1st Commonwealth Division: 29th Infantry Brigade Group; 28th British Commonwealth Brigade; 25th Canadian Infantry Brigade	191st Division

Strength
400	3 battalions

The Second Battle of Maryang-san (4–6 November 1951) was fought during the Korean War, in which British forces, possessing a Maryang-san (Hill 317, a.k.a. Hill 315) and surrounding area (Hill 217), were overwhelmed by Chinese forces. The hill remained in Chinese hands for the remainder of the war.

== Background ==
By this stage in the Korean War the frontline had been consolidated with fortifications, and there was not much movement. Rather like World War One, strategic objectives would be hills or specific areas of land, rather than sweeping objectives or pushes. By September 1950, Australian and Canadian forces, as part of the 27th British Commonwealth Brigade left the area, and were replaced by the British 29th Infantry Brigade Group, then followed by the 28th British Commonwealth Brigade in April 1951. The 25th Canadian Infantry Brigade was the last to arrive and reinforce the area. The units were then all formed into the 1st Commonwealth Division. In October 1951, the Chinese People's Volunteer Army (PVA) had made efforts to attack and take the hill at the First Battle of Maryang-san. PVA forces were pushed back and defeated by Australian forces.

== Action ==
The PVA first launched a large scale bombardment of the area, including rockets, on the night of 5 November. The barrage lasted 15 hours. The barrage was then followed up by a human wave attack of massed PVA troops, and the British were overrun. Some troops established a fighting withdrawal, and PVA troops captured the hill, taking British prisoners. The hill was defended by 400 British troops, but attacked by three battalions.

Private Bill Speakman was awarded Britain's Victoria Cross at this battle for his bravery. Speakman had been conveying a supply of grenades to the British troops, on a ridge known as Hill 217 in Marysang-san. When the PVA attacked, Speakman took it on his own initiative to gather 6 men, and then began throwing grenades at the PVA. He engaged the enemy with grenades and guns, making repeated charges against them in different directions. When the men ran out of grenades, they began throwing bottles and metal tea pots from the kitchen supply. This gave time for his unit to withdraw. Even while wounded in the leg, he continued to charge at the PVA.

== See also ==
- First Battle of Maryang-san
