= Frank Hassett =

Australian general

Sir Frank Hassett
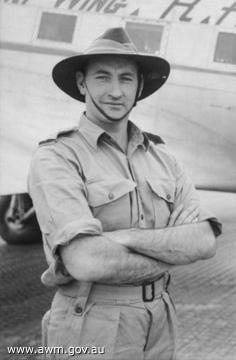
- Lieutenant Colonel Hassett at an airfield in Korea, just prior to taking command of 3RAR in July 1951
- Born: 11 April 1918; Marrickville, New South Wales
- Died: 11 June 2008 (aged 90); Canberra, Australian Capital Territory
- Military career
- Allegiance: Australia
- Branch: Australian Army
- Service years: 1935–1977
- Rank: General
- Commands: Chief of the Defence Force Staff (1975–77); Chief of the General Staff (1973–75); Northern Command (1968–70); 28th Commonwealth Infantry Brigade (1960–63); 3rd Battalion, Royal Australian Regiment (1951–52); 1st Battalion, Royal Australian Regiment (1951)
- Conflicts: Second World War; North African campaign; Battle of Bardia; South West Pacific Theatre; New Guinea campaign; Huon Peninsula campaign; Bougainville Campaign; Korean War; Operation Commando; Battle of Maryang San; Malayan Emergency
- Awards: Companion of the Order of Australia; Knight Commander of the Order of the British Empire; Companion of the Order of the Bath; Distinguished Service Order; Lieutenant of the Royal Victorian Order; Mentioned in Despatches (2)

General Sir Francis George Hassett, AC, KBE, CB, DSO, LVO (11 April 1918 – 11 June 2008) was an Australian general who rose to the position of Chief of the Defence Force Staff, the professional head of the Australian Defence Force, serving in this capacity from November 1975 until April 1977. Hassett joined the Australian Army in 1935 upon gaining entrance into the Royal Military College, Duntroon. Serving with distinction in the early stages of the Second World War, he was promoted to lieutenant colonel in 1942 at the age of 23, and posted as a staff officer for the remainder of the war.

In 1951, Hassett was appointed to command the 3rd Battalion, Royal Australian Regiment in Korea, where he led the unit through some of the toughest fighting of the war. For his leadership and planning during the Battle of Maryang San, he was granted an immediate award of the Distinguished Service Order. Promoted to brigadier in 1960, Hassett commanded a brigade in Malaya for three years, before returning to Australia and serving in a variety of positions, culminating in his appointment as Chief of the General Staff with the rank of lieutenant general. Promoted to general after two years in this role, he was appointed Chairman, Chiefs of Staff Committee, which was reorganised as Chief of the Defence Force Staff the following year. Hassett died in 2008 at the age of 90.

== Early life and career ==
Hassett was born on 11 April 1918, in the Sydney suburb of Marrickville. The son of a railway yard manager, he attended Canterbury Boys' High School before leaving at the age of 15 and gaining employment with the Department of Tramways. Seeking a position at the Royal Military College, Duntroon, he only gained entry after receiving special consideration from Colonel John Lavarack, the Chairman of the College's Selection Board. Hassett began his course at the college in March 1935, aged 16, and soon proved himself a capable cadet. He excelled at military subjects and excelled in the College rugby, boxing, equestrian and athletics teams, later captaining the rugby XV. In 1938 he was promoted to under officer, a position marking him as the senior cadet in his company, and commissioned as a lieutenant on 14 December 1938.

Upon graduation, Hassett was posted to the Darwin Mobile Force and given command of a rifle platoon, and then of a Mortar Platoon. Due to the constraints of the Defence Act, the Darwin Mobile Force was officially designated an artillery unit and he thus began his infantry career in the artillery.

== Second World War ==
At the outbreak of the Second World War, Hassett was posted as adjutant to the 2/3rd Battalion of the 6th Division with effect from 13 December 1939. The division sailed for the Middle East from Sydney on 10 January 1940, and disembarked in Egypt a little over a month later in preparation for service in the North African Campaign. Hassett was promoted to captain on 1 May 1940. After further training in Palestine and Egypt, the battalion took part in an attack on the Italian coastal fortress of Bardia. Two weeks later, the 2/3rd Battalion took part in the capture of Tobruk by the 6th Division. Tasked with laying white tapes for a start-line on the eve of the attack, Hassett found a weak point in the Italian front line, where he proceeded to lay the tapes. In an effort to complete the task before dawn, he began to walk instead of crawling and prodding for mines; one duly blew up, with Hassett suffering shrapnel wounds to his foot. He was subsequently Mentioned in Despatches for his actions. Having recovered from his wounds, Hassett was sent to the British Army Staff College at Haifa and was subsequently promoted to major. Shortly afterwards, he was posted as brigade major to the 18th Brigade in Syria.

When Japan entered the war, Hassett planned and controlled the brigade's embarkation from Suez and return to Australia, learning on his arrival that he had been promoted to lieutenant colonel. At 23, he was the youngest army officer to attain that rank. Training postings followed before he received an appointment as a staff officer in New Guinea. By the end of the Second World War, he was chief of staff to the 3rd Division conducting operations against the Japanese forces on the island of Bougainville, without having an operational command. For his services in the Pacific, Hassett was again Mentioned in Despatches and appointed as an Officer of the Order of the British Empire.

== Inter-bellum ==
Returning to Australia after the end of the war, Hassett was posted as an instructor at the Australian Army Staff College in Toowoomba. On 18 May 1946 he married Hallie Roberts, with whom he had four children. In 1948, Hassett was posted as a staff officer to the 2nd Division, remaining in this position until March 1951, when he assumed command of the 1st Battalion, Royal Australian Regiment (1RAR). While in command of the battalion at Holsworthy Barracks, New South Wales, the couple's first child, a daughter named Lyndal, was born.

== Korean War ==
In June 1951, Hassett was sent to Korea to assume command of the 3rd Battalion, Royal Australian Regiment (3RAR). He led the battalion through some of the toughest fighting of the war, which reached its peak in October–December 1951 in Operation Commando. The operation was designed to strengthen the Allied position, and on 5 October Hassett was tasked with the capture of Hill 317, better known as Maryang San.

Maryang San was a two-mile-long crescent-shaped ridge with irregular extending spurs rising two hundred meters above the valley. Ideal for defence, it was held by well-entrenched Chinese troops supported by artillery and mortars. While British forces attacked further west, men from A Company 3RAR attempted an advance along a spur south-east of the summit. The attack acted as a feint by drawing Chinese defenders away from the main ridgeline, up which B and D Companies then advanced. After a series of assaults, D Company managed to capture four knolls leading up the ridgeline before C Company took over the attack and captured a feature known as Baldy, before moving on quickly to occupy the summit, which had been abandoned by the Chinese.

Throughout the next day, the Australians held the summit against heavy Chinese fire and several attempts to infiltrate the position. Early on 7 October, B Company captured the final objective, 'the Hinge', after heavy fighting. Subject to severe and continuous artillery bombardment throughout the following day, the Chinese attempted a number of counter-attacks in the evening; all of which were repulsed before the Chinese finally withdrew and the Australians' hold on Maryang San was secured. For his leadership and planning during the battle, Hassett received an immediate award of the Distinguished Service Order, before returning to Australia in July 1952, where he was posted as the director of military art at the Royal Military College, Duntroon.

== Senior command ==
In 1954, Hassett served as a marshal for Queen Elizabeth II's world tour, and was appointed a Lieutenant of the Royal Victorian Order for his service. Promoted to brigadier in 1960, he was appointed to command the 28th Commonwealth Infantry Brigade in Malaya, conducting counter-insurgency operations. During this time he also led participation in regional exercises with Thailand and contributed to developments in tropical warfare and counter-insurgency. Upon leaving Malaya in 1963, he attended the Imperial Defence College in London, before returning to Canberra as Deputy Chief of the General Staff with the rank of major general. In the 1966 New Years Honours, Hassett was upgraded to a Commander of the Order of the British Empire, and also awarded the Malaysian Pingat Jasa Kebaktian (Meritorious Service Medal) for his services in Malaya.

Appointed General Officer in Command of Australia's Northern Command in 1968, Hassett was appointed as a Companion of the Order of the Bath in the Queen's Birthday Honours of 1970. Later that year, he was selected to lead the Army Review Committee, which became more colloquially known as the "Hassett Committee". The committee's far reaching reforms included moving from a geographical to a functional command system, which involved (in part) the replacement of the various State Army Command Headquarters with a national field force, training and logistics command system; a system that remains largely in place today. In 1971 Hassett was appointed Vice Chief of the General Staff and tasked with implementing the organisational reforms he had initiated, as well as supervising the end of conscription, the withdrawal of Australian troops from Vietnam, and the consequential organisational changes brought about by a reduction in Army manpower.

In 1973 Hassett was promoted to lieutenant general and appointed Chief of the General Staff. Made a Companion of the Order of Australia in June 1975, he was promoted to general in November and became Chairman, Chiefs of Staff Committee, the professional head of the Australian Military Forces. When the Australian Defence Force (ADF) was established on 9 February 1976, Hassett assumed the new appointment of Chief of the Defence Force Staff, which expanded his authority over the three services and made him the ADF's first commander. In June 1976 Hassett was knighted as a Knight Commander of the Order of the British Empire. Ill health forced Hassett into retirement in April 1977; he was awarded the National Medal in the 1977 Queen's Birthday Honours.

== Retirement ==
Following his retirement, General and Lady Hassett settled into farming near Canberra, where he was later appointed Colonel Commandant of the Royal Australian Regiment. In 2006, after a sizable donation was made to the Royal Australian Regiment Foundation by the pair, the Hassett Award was established in order to annually honour junior leadership within the regiment.

General Hassett died at his home on 11 June 2008 after a long battle with illness.

Military offices
New title Replaced position of Chairman, Chiefs of Staff Committee	Chief of Defence Force Staff; 1976–1977	Succeeded by General Sir Arthur MacDonald
Preceded by Admiral Sir Victor Smith	Chairman, Chiefs of Staff Committee; 1975–1976	Position replaced by Chief of Defence Force Staff
Preceded by Lieutenant General Sir Mervyn Brogan	Chief of the General Staff; 1973–1975	Succeeded by Lieutenant General Arthur MacDonald
