= 2nd Garrison Division of Shenyang Military Region =

Former Chinese military unit

160th Division (1948–49) 207th Division (1949) 1st Division, Public Security Central Column (1949–50) 1st Public Security Division (1950–55) 1st Machine-gun Artillery Division (1955–56) 2nd Garrison Division (1956–1969) 2nd Garrison Division of Shenyang Military Region (1969–1985) 2nd Garrison Brigade of Shenyang Military Region (1985–1992)
- Country: (China)
- Type: Infantry, Garrison
- Size: Brigade
- Engagements: Chinese Civil War, Korean War

The 160th Division (Chinese: 第160师) was created in November 1948 under the Regulation of the Redesignations of All Organizations and Units of the Army, issued by the Central Military Commission on November 1, 1948, based on the 8th Independent Division of the Northeastern Field Army.

Under the command of the 47th Corps it took part in the Chinese Civil War. In January 1949 the division, commanded by Lin Biao, was ordered to guard Beijing. During this time it numbered around 15,000 personnel. In March 1949 the division was detached from the corps and renamed as the 207th Division (Chinese: 第207师) (2nd Formation) and put in charge of the security of Peking city. In September the division was converted to the 1st Division, Public Security Central Column (Chinese: 公安中央纵队第1师).

It took part in the 1949 national parade of the People's Republic of China.

On November 7, 1950, the division was renamed as the 1st Public Security Division (Chinese: 公安第1师) and was transferred to the Public Security Force's control.

From December 7, 1952, the division entered Korea to take part in the Korean War as a part of the People's Volunteer Army until 1955.

In March 1955 the division returned from Korea and converted to the 1st Machine-gun Artillery Division (Chinese: 第1机炮师). It took the equipment left by the 25th Guards Machine-gun Artillery Division, 39th Army of the Soviet Union pulling out from the Lüda region.

The division then consisted of:

- 1st Machine-gun Artillery Regiment (former 1st Public Security Regiment);
- 2nd Machine-gun Artillery Regiment (former 2nd Public Security Regiment);
- 3rd Machine-gun Artillery Regiment (former 5th Public Security Regiment);
- 4th Machine-gun Artillery Regiment (former Independent Regiment of the People's Volunteer Army);
- Self-Propelled Artillery Regiment;
- Artillery Regiment (former 23rd Artillery Regiment of the 12th Artillery Division).

The division was then back to the National Defense Force's control, under the command of the 64th Corps.

In June 1956 the division was transferred to the 3rd Army Group's direct control.

On June 26, 1956, the division was renamed as the 2nd Garrison Division (Chinese: 守备第2师). All Machine-gun Artillery regiments were renamed as garrison regiments:

- 11th Garrison Regiment (former 1st Machine-gun Artillery);
- 12th Garrison Regiment (former 2nd Machine-gun Artillery);
- 13th Garrison Regiment (former 3rd Machine-gun Artillery);
- 14th Garrison Regiment (former 4th Machine-gun Artillery);
- Self-Propelled Artillery Regiment;
- Artillery Regiment.

On October 13, 1963, the 11th Garrison Regiment detached from the division.

On February 27, 1969, the division exchanged its garrison with the 3rd Garrison Division and moved to Zhuanghe, Liaoning.

From December 1969 it became the 2nd Garrison Division of Shenyang Military Region (Chinese: 沈阳军区守备第2师), and all its regiments were re-designated as:

- 4th Garrison Regiment (former 12th Garrison);
- 5th Garrison Regiment (former 13th Garrison);
- 6th Garrison Regiment (former 14th Garrison);
- Self-Propelled Artillery Regiment;
- Artillery Regiment.

On July 14, 1976, the Self-Propelled Artillery Regiment was renamed as a Tank Regiment.

In March 1981 the Tank Regiment, 2nd Garrison Division detached from the division and transferred to the 8th Garrison Division of Shenyang Military Region.

In October 1985 the division was reduced and renamed as the 2nd Garrison Brigade of Lüda Security District (Chinese: 旅大警备区守备2旅). In 1992 it was further reduced and renamed as the Coastal Defense Regiment of Shenyang Military Region (Chinese: 沈阳军区海防团) and attached to Liaoning Provincial Military District.
