= First Battle of Maryang-san =

Battle of the Korean War

- Part of the Korean War
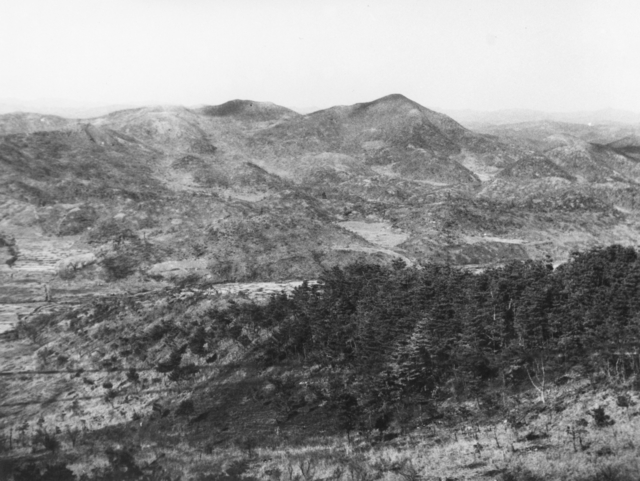
- Maryang-san (right), Korea
Date	3–8 October 1951
Location	Maryang-san, Near Imjin River 38°8′6″N 126°55′15″E
Result	United Nations victory

Belligerents
United Nations: United States; United Kingdom; Australia; New Zealand; Canada	China

Commanders and leaders
(United States) Matthew Ridgway (United States) James Van Fleet (United Kingdom) James Cassels (United Kingdom) George Taylor (Canada) J. M. Rockingham (Australia) Francis Hassett	(China) Peng Dehuai (China) Yang Dezhi (China) Zeng Siyu (China) Xie Zhengrong

Units involved
1st Commonwealth Division; 28th Commonwealth Infantry Brigade (Canada) 25th Canadian Infantry Brigade; 29th Infantry Brigade (United Kingdom) (Australia) 3 RAR (Canada) 2 PPCLI	(China) 191st Division

Strength
320 men	1,200 men

Casualties and losses
20 killed 104 wounded	283 killed 50 captured
- Location within modern-day North Korea

The First Battle of Maryang-san (3–8 October 1951), also known as the Defensive Battle of Maliangshan (Chinese: 馬良山防衛戰; pinyin: Mǎliáng Shān Fángyù Zhàn), was fought during the Korean War between United Nations Command (UN) forces—primarily Australian, British and Canadian—and the Chinese People's Volunteer Army (PVA). The fighting occurred during a limited UN offensive by US I Corps, codenamed Operation Commando. This offensive ultimately pushed the PVA back from the Imjin River to the Jamestown Line and destroyed elements of four PVA armies following heavy fighting. (Note: In Chinese military nomenclature, the term "Army" (军) means Corps, while the term "Army Group" (集团军) means Field Army.) The much smaller battle at Maryang-san took place over a five-day period, and saw the 1st Commonwealth Division dislodge a numerically superior PVA force from the tactically important Kowang-san (Hill 355), Hill 187, and Maryang-san (Hill 317, a.k.a. Hill 315) features.

Using tactics first developed against the Japanese in New Guinea during the Second World War, the Australians gained the advantage of the high ground and assaulted the PVA positions from unexpected directions. They then repelled repeated PVA counterattacks aimed at re-capturing Maryang San and Kowang-san (the latter on 12 October), with both sides suffering heavy casualties before the Australians were finally relieved by a British battalion. However, with the peace-talks ongoing, these operations proved to be the last actions in the war of manoeuvre, which had lasted the previous sixteen months. It was replaced by a static war characterised by fixed defences reminiscent of the Western Front in 1915–17. A month later, the PVA re-captured Maryang San during fierce fighting, and it was never re-gained. Today, the battle is widely regarded as one of the Australian Army's greatest accomplishments during the war.

== Background ==
=== Military situation ===
Following General of the Army Douglas MacArthur's dismissal as Commander-in-Chief of UN forces in Korea, he was replaced by General Matthew B. Ridgway. Consequently, on 14 April 1951, General James Van Fleet replaced Ridgway as commander of the US Eighth Army and the UN ground forces in Korea. The Chinese Spring Offensive during April and May 1951 ended in its defeat, while the UN May–June 1951 counteroffensive erased all PVA gains. In July the Kansas and Wyoming Lines were strengthened, while a limited offensive in the east-central sector in mid-August seized the high ground around the Punchbowl and Bloody Ridge. In September the offensive in this sector continued, targeting the next hill complex north of Bloody Ridge, known as Heartbreak Ridge.

Meanwhile, the organisation of British Commonwealth ground forces fighting in Korea as part of the UN Command had undergone considerable change in the months following the battles of the Imjin River and Kapyong in late-April 1951. 27th British Infantry Brigade had been redesignated as 28th British Commonwealth Brigade when Brigadier Brian Burke had been transported to Hong Kong during the Battle of Kapyong. Meanwhile, after protracted negotiations between the governments of Australia, Britain, Canada, India, New Zealand and South Africa, agreement had been reached to establish an integrated formation with the aim of increasing the political significance of their contribution, as well as facilitating the solution of the logistic and operational problems faced by the various Commonwealth contingents.

The 1st Commonwealth Division was formed on 28 July 1951, with the division including the 25th Canadian, 28th British Commonwealth and 29th British infantry brigades under the command of Major General James Cassels, and was part of US I Corps. Since its formation, the division had occupied part of the west-central sector of the UN line, approximately 48 kilometres (30 mi) north of the capital Seoul. The 28th Brigade included three infantry battalions—the 1st Battalion, King's Own Scottish Borderers (1 KOSB), 1st Battalion, King's Shropshire Light Infantry (1 KSLI) and the 3rd Battalion, Royal Australian Regiment—under the command of Brigadier George Taylor. During this period 3 RAR was commanded by Lieutenant Colonel Francis Hassett. Peace-talks at Kaesong during July and September led to a lull in the fighting and 3 RAR undertook mainly defensive duties, helping to construct the defences of the Kansas Line south of the Imjin River, as well as conducting extensive patrolling on the northern side. The battalion also used the reduced operational tempo as an opportunity to train reinforcements. The period culminated in a limited, and largely unopposed, divisional advance 12 kilometres (7.5 mi) north of the Imjin to the Wyoming Line, codenamed Operation Minden, in September.

== Prelude ==
=== Opposing forces ===
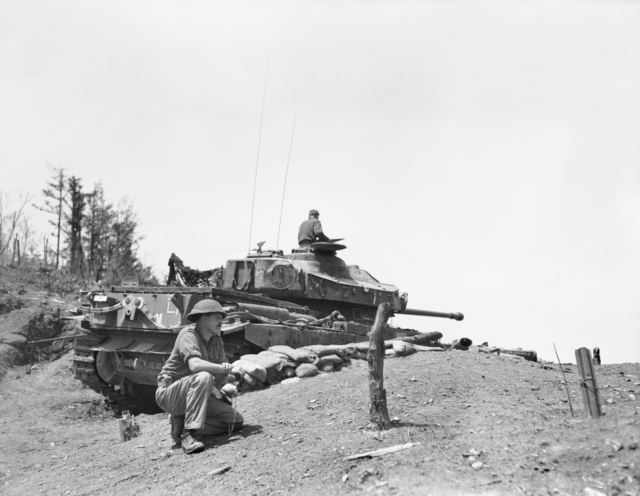
A British Centurion tank similar to those used at Maryang San

In late-September and early-October—even while continuing the attack against Heartbreak Ridge, Van Fleet developed a plan for a limited offensive in the western section, known as Operation Commando, to advance 10 kilometres (6.2 mi) north of the 38th Parallel, with the aim of pushing PVA forces back and giving United Nations forces more leverage at the truce negotiations now occurring at Panmunjom. Operation Commando was scheduled for 3–5 October 1951 and the US I Corps commander, Lieutenant General John W. O'Daniel, envisioned a concept of operations in which three of the Corps' four divisions would advance on a broad front in conjunction with US 25th Infantry Division on the left flank of the neighbouring US IX Corps, seizing a new defensive line known as the Jamestown Line. The divisions to be used in the advance included the 1st Commonwealth Division, US 1st Cavalry Division and the Republic of Korea Army (ROK) 9th Division. The ROK 1st Division would remain in its existing position on the left flank.

In the sector occupied by 1st Commonwealth Division, PVA forces were dug into a group of hills overlooking the Imjin River. The division faced 6,000 troops from the PVA 191st Division, 64th Army under the overall command of Xie Zhengrong. (Note: The Chinese military did not have ranks during the 1950s, except for the title of "Commander" or "Commissar". Xie was the commander of the Chinese 191st Division.) The PVA forces were divided into three regiments of about 2,000 men each, with two regiments dug-in in well prepared defensive positions with overhead protection, and a third regiment in support. The 28th Brigade faced one of the two forward regiments—the 571st Regiment—which was deployed with one battalion on Hill 355, a second battalion astride Hill 217 and Hill 317, and a third battalion in reserve to the west.

The task allocated to the British Commonwealth force was to take these positions with the intention of advancing the line from the southern bank of the Imjin to a line of hills to the north, in total an objective that stretched more than 15 kilometres (9.3 mi). The primary objectives of the advance would be the capture of Kowang San (Hill 355) and Maryang San (Hill 317) and the task of taking these positions was allocated to the 28th British Commonwealth Brigade, with this formation bearing the brunt of the fighting. (Note: Kowang-San (Hill 355) was also known as Little Gibraltar to the Americans, British and Australians and is often referred to as such in histories of the battle.) Cassels planned on capturing the Jamestown Line in three phases. In the first phase, scheduled for 3 October, the 28th Brigade would take Hill 355 in the east-central sector. During the second phase, on 4 October, the 25th Canadian would assault the two Hill 187 features and the south-western ridge running to the Samichon (Sami River). Lastly during the third phase, scheduled for 5 October, the 28th Brigade would capture Hills 217 and 317. As such, the bulk of the division's strength would be concentrated on the right flank, to be held by the 28th Brigade; meanwhile, the 25th Brigade would hold the left flank and the 29th Brigade would be held in reserve while providing a battalion to each of the other brigades as reinforcements.

Kowang-San would be assaulted during the first phase by 1 KOSB with 1 KSLI and 3 RAR in support, while Maryang San would be taken in the third phase of the operation by 3 RAR and the 1st Battalion, Royal Northumberland Fusiliers (1 RNF), which was detached from the 29th Brigade to the 28th Brigade for the duration of Operation Commando. Careful reconnaissance and planning took place in the week prior to the commencement of the operation and Taylor emphasised the use of indirect fires, air support and infiltration tactics to limit casualties, as well as the exploitation of weak points in the PVA defences. In direct support of the brigade was 16th Field Regiment, Royal New Zealand Artillery with its 3.45-inch (88 mm) 25-pounder field guns, in addition to divisional and corps assets which included 4.2-inch (110 mm) mortars, 3-inch (76 mm) howitzers and 155-millimetre (6.1 in) heavy artillery; in total more than 120 guns and mortars. Also in support were two British Centurion tank squadrons from the 8th Royal Irish Hussars.

=== Preliminary operations ===
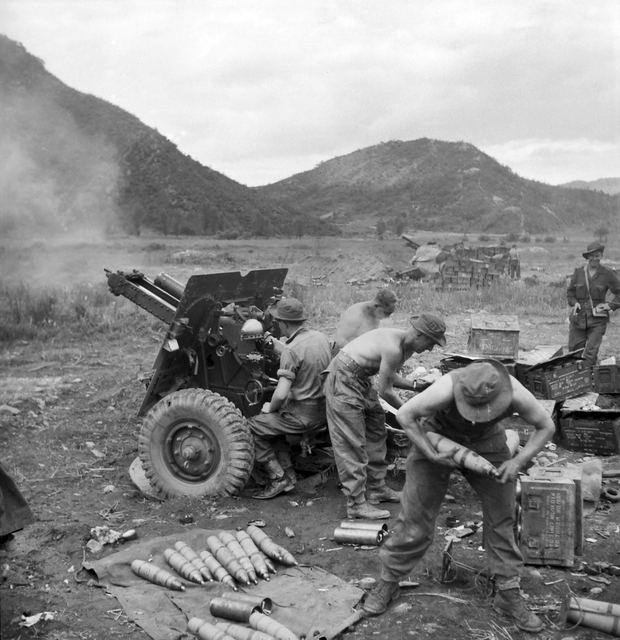
New Zealand gunners firing a 25-pounder in Korea

Given the primary task of capturing Hill 317, Hassett studied the approaches from the air and the ground. Two previous attempts to take Maryang San by American troops had been unsuccessful. Regardless, utilising tactics first developed against the Japanese in New Guinea during the Second World War of running along the tops of ridges, he intended to gain the advantage of the high ground, while utilising the cover afforded by the vegetation and the ease of movement along the crest-lines, in order to assault the PVA positions from unexpected directions. Meanwhile, the PVA defenders on Maryang San were also testing a newly developed tactic called the "mobile positional defense", in which only small units were stationed on the hills in order to exhaust the UN attackers, while the bulk of the PVA defenders would later counterattack before the UN forces could consolidate into their newly gained positions.

However, during the first phase of the operation the Australians would be tasked with capturing a PVA outpost on Hill 199 to allow tanks and medium machine-guns to provide direct fires onto the northern and eastern slopes of Hill 355 in support of an attack by the Borderers from the south-east. Likewise, the Shropshires would assault and capture Hill 208. Finally then, two days before the start of Operation Commando, the 28th Brigade crossed the Imjin river to assemble behind the 25th Brigade on 1 October. The following day the 3 RAR, less D Company, and the Borderers moved forward carefully into their assembly areas, ready to advance the following morning. C Company advanced to a position 1,500 metres (1,600 yd) in front of the Canadian positions, north-east of Hill 355. B Company was 200 metres (220 yd) to the rear. In the afternoon C Company was subjected to heavy shelling, losing one soldier wounded. D Company—under the command of Major Basil Hardiman—was detached to 25th Brigade to strengthen its extended front, and it would not be available until the afternoon of 3 October.

== Battle ==
=== Capture of Hill 199, 3 October 1951 ===
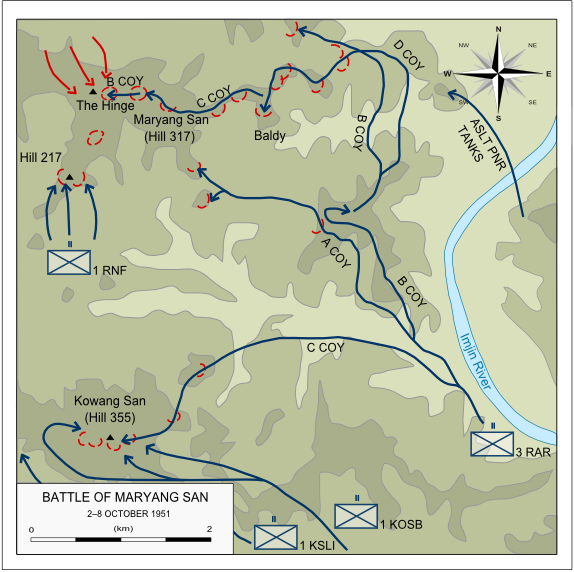
The First Battle of Maryang San, 2–8 October 1951.

At 03:00 on 3 October, B Company 3 RAR moved north 2,000 metres (2,200 yd) toward Hill 199, crossing the open valley under the cover of darkness and heavy mist. A Company then moved up behind C Company. Artillery and mortar fire targeted known PVA artillery positions with counter-battery fire prior to dawn, before switching to support the Borderers in their assault on Hill 355. Simultaneously, the Shropshires were assaulting Hill 208 and with the support of A Squadron, 8th Royal Irish Hussars they reached the positions without opposition by 06:00. By 08:00 B Company had gained the high ground to the north and then proceeded to patrol the short distance to west to the objective which was then taken with three wounded; five PVA were killed and one captured. By mid-morning, both the Shropshires and the Australians had successfully captured their objectives.

Expecting a counter-attack, the Australians on Hill 199 began digging-in, however no such attack occurred. D Company subsequently returned and was allocated a position between C Company and the Borderers. C and B Companies both received shelling during the day, wounding two men. At 10:00 A Company—under Captain Jim Shelton—took over the defence of Hill 199, and B Company went into reserve behind A Company. According to plan a troop of Centurion tanks and a section of medium machine-guns were then moved up onto Hill 199 and began directing their fire onto the northern slopes of Hill 355 in support of the Borderers. Meanwhile, at 07:15, following preparation by artillery and mortar fire, the lead British assault companies had begun to advance on Hill 355. However, with the PVA expecting an assault from that direction, the initial British moves met strong resistance and the Borderers were forced to withdraw and reorganise. At 14:15 a second assault reached the objectives on the lower slopes, and these gains were consolidated by nightfall.

The attack was now behind schedule. Indeed, the Borderers were still more than 1,000 yards (910 m) short of their final objective, and with stubborn resistance being encountered during the initial phase, Hill 355 would now not be secured until the afternoon of 4 October. The assault was being slowed by two positions on the northeast slopes of Hill 355—known as Hill 220—from which the PVA held the British right flank in enfilade. C Company 3 RAR would be detached to assist the attack on Kowang-San the next morning, with the Australians tasked with outflanking the PVA defences and capturing this position. Heavy PVA artillery fire had also slowed progress with more than 2,500 rounds falling in the 28th Brigade area in the previous twenty-four hours, although this total was dwarfed many times over by the weight of allied artillery fired across the brigade front, which included 22,324 rounds. On the division's left flank, the delay also meant that the Canadian attack scheduled for 06:00 the next day in the 25th Brigade sector would have to be postponed until 11:00, due to the continuing requirement to use the divisional artillery in support of 28th Brigade.

=== Capture of Hill 220 and the fall of Kowang-San, 4 October 1951 ===
On 4 October, C Company 3 RAR—under the command of Major Jack Gerke—attacked the long spur running east from the peak of Hill 355, known as Hill 220. Launching their assault at 09:00, the Australians quickly killed or drove off the defenders before pressing on up the spur and routing the remainder of a PVA company. Reaching their objectives by 10:00, the Australians then took advantage of the initiative gained so far, pushing a platoon towards the summit of Hill 355. Amid heavy fighting, the Australians cleared the eastern slopes of Kowang-San by 12:00, despite having received no orders to do so. Thirteen PVA were killed and three captured in the fighting, while Australian casualties included 11 wounded, one of whom subsequently died. Gerke was later awarded the Distinguished Service Order (DSO) for his leadership. C Company withdrew to the rear of the 3 RAR position and were replaced by D Company, who occupied the position held by A Company 500 metres (550 yd) north of Hill 199. Meanwhile, led by a bagpiper, the Borderers made a simultaneous assault up the western face of Kowang-San, and fearing they may be caught between two attacks the PVA defenders abandoned Hill 355, withdrawing northwest under heavy indirect fire.

Given the strong resistance exhibited by the PVA, the Canadians expected a tough fight as 25th Brigade prepared to assault its objectives as part of the second phase of the divisional plan. Yet with the loss of Hill 355 and 210 the PVA unexpectedly withdrew from their well-prepared defensive positions, with Hill 159 and 175 captured without opposition. Only the 2nd Battalion, Princess Patricia's Canadian Light Infantry encountered any opposition before they captured the two Hill 187 features, losing one killed and six wounded during stiff fighting in which 28 PVA were also killed. Indeed, the ease with which the Canadians had captured their initial objectives allowed them to press on, attaining their final objectives on the Jamestown Line by nightfall. No further resistance was encountered, although heavy PVA artillery fire caused a number of casualties, including three killed. The Canadians subsequently occupied the positions they were destined to hold for the next twenty-two months of fighting.

On 12 October, 2 PPCLI commanded by Lt. Col. James Riley Stone repelled a large force of at least a battalion of PVA attackers during a night action, exacting heavy casualties. Stone was awarded a second bar to his DSO for this and other actions that year, which had included the Battle of Kapyong in April 1951.

Meanwhile, on the 28th Brigade's left flank the Shropshires met slight resistance, securing Hill 210 southwest of Kowang-San by 10:10. They were then relieved by the Canadians by nightfall in preparation for the third phase of the operation. The brigade plan was now a day behind schedule, although with the unexpected success experienced by the Canadians, overall, the divisional attack was still running according to plan. However, determined to hold on following the loss of Hill 355, the PVA moved in fresh troops, heavily reinforcing a number of positions, including Maryang San.

=== Fall of Maryang San, 5 October 1951 ===
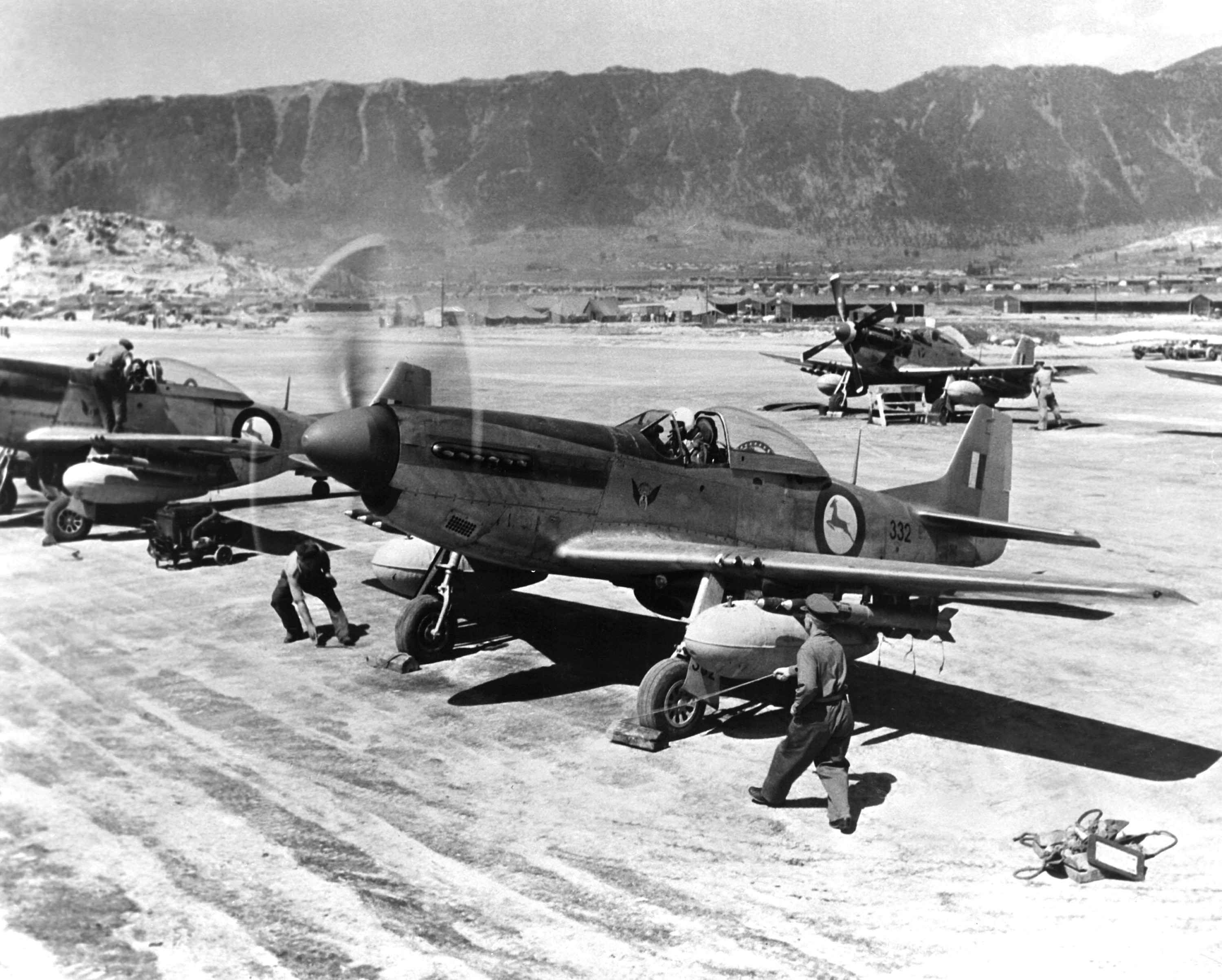
No. 2 Squadron SAAF Mustang fighters during the Korean War

The final objective was Maryang San, a steep hill rising 200 metres (660 ft) above the valley about 2,500 metres (2,700 yd) north of Hill 355. However, following the delay in capturing Hill 355, Hassett would not be ready to implement his plan until early the next day. As such the third phase would begin on 5 October, with the Royal Northumberland Fusiliers scheduled to attack an intermediate objective—Hill 217, adjacent Kowang-San—before assisting the Australians assault Hill 317. The Australians moved into position northeast of Hill 199 on the afternoon of 4 October, while over the night of 4/5 October the divisional artillery hit PVA positions, with two batteries of 8-inch (200 mm) howitzers and another two 155-millimetre (6.1 in) batteries supplementing them. Air strikes by the Mustangs of No. 2 Squadron, South African Air Force were also planned, targeting PVA concentrations north and west of the objectives to cut-off supplies and reinforcements. Both the Australians and Fusiliers were scheduled to begin their attacks at first light—at 05:45—following a heavy artillery preparation.

In the dark the Fusiliers moved off, but amid dense fog they found it difficult to maintain their bearings and were not in position in time to commence the attack as planned. By 10:00 they had struggled to within 300 metres (330 yd) from their objective, and following further delays the assault was commenced at 11:00. After initially achieving surprise a number of the forward PVA outposts fell to the Fusiliers. Occupying strong defensive positions on Hill 217, the PVA regained the initiative however, and poured heavy machine-gun and rifle fire onto the attackers as they crossed the valley, forcing them to withdraw after suffering heavy casualties and running low on ammunition. Having expected the main axis of assault from the south, the PVA positions were stronger than previously considered and the Fusiliers were unable to gain the summit, despite one company gaining a toehold on the summit by midday.

Earlier that morning, at 04:45, B and D Companies 3 RAR had moved north across the valley, while Anti-Tank Platoon crossed the Imjin, taking up positions further north in order to protect the right flank. The assaulting companies would then move west towards a series of objectives before assaulting Hill 317. Initially 3 RAR was to attack from the east, while 1 RNF would attack from the southwest through Hill 217, however with the Fusiliers facing stiff resistance on Hill 217 itself they were unable to get forward to assist. The previous attempts to capture Maryang San had failed due to the approach to steep eastern slopes of the feature being across a wide, open valley that was dominated by enfilade fire from mutually supporting PVA positions. Consequently, the Australians planned to cross the valley under cover of darkness and position themselves on the PVA flank in the foothills, before scaling the position at first light. A Company would create a diversion on the left flank, while B Company would clear the lower slopes before D Company passed through to assault the PVA main defensive position, known as the 'Victor' feature, in a one-up, one-in-depth assault. However, following the casualties of previous nights on Hill 199, 220 and 355, and the effect of constant shelling, 3 RAR was now reduced to just 320 men. In contrast, the Australians faced two fresh PVA battalions on Maryang San, in total about 1,200 men.

Chinese soldiers from the 64th Army defending Maryang San

B Company—commanded by Captain Henry Nicholls—led off shrouded in the heavy mist, and with visibility limited in the thick vegetation, it drifted to the right off the intended axis of advance having lost direction, suffering a similar fate as the Fusiliers. Disorientated, the assaulting companies became separated and the battalion attack turned into a series of independent company attacks. D Company slowly continued forward however, and when the mist lifted suddenly at 11:20 they were left dangerously exposed still only halfway up the slope to their objective. The Australian approach had surprised the PVA however, who were apparently expecting the assault from the north, and D Company succeeded in closing to within grenade range of the PVA on Victor. During a fierce twenty-minute fire-fight the Australians cleared their first objective with the assistance of direct fire from supporting tanks, and indirect fire support from artillery, losing three killed and 12 wounded. Included among the Australian wounded was the company commander and one of the platoon commanders, both of whom remained in command despite gunshot wounds. PVA losses included 30 killed and 10 captured.

During the initial phase A Company had attacked southwest along a spur leading to Hill 317 and had met stiff opposition. The diversion was largely successful however, causing the PVA to reinforce against the attack, which they believed to be the main effort. Meanwhile, D Company continued to press their attack along the high ground towards the 'Uniform' feature, assaulting the deeply entrenched PVA positions, which included heavy automatic weapons. By 16:00 it had successfully captured the last of the intermediate objectives assigned to it and a platoon from B Company was pushed forward to assist in the clearance of the feature. Later, Lieutenant L.G. Clark was awarded the Military Cross while Sergeant W.J. Rowlinson was awarded a bar to his Distinguished Conduct Medal for their actions during the fighting. By this time total PVA casualties included 98 killed and 40 captured, while the Australians believed that a large number of PVA had also been wounded. Following the progress of B and D Companies, C Company was moved up behind them and with the capture of final objective they immediately commenced an assault on Hill 317, capturing 10 prisoners for no loss. Although the PVA had been well dug-in, there were no barbed wire obstacles to hamper the attackers and the Australians had rapidly gained the position. By 17:00, Maryang San had fallen to the Australians, with the PVA withdrawing under heavy artillery, mortar and machine-gun fire.

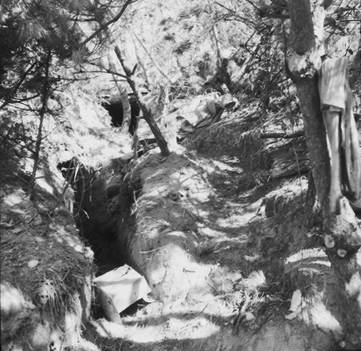
Abandoned Chinese positions

On Hill 217 the Fusiliers had maintained the pressure on the PVA throughout the day, however they were still unable to capture the feature. Regardless, the efforts of the Fusiliers in conjunction with A Company's diversionary attack and the rapid advance of D Company with tank and artillery support had carried the day. A Company continued to attack against heavy opposition and indirect fire, slowly pushing the PVA defenders back. Later, a platoon was detached to assist C Company consolidate the defence of Maryang San following its capture, while the remaining two platoons were withdrawn rearwards, again under heavy artillery fire. Indeed, although it had played a supporting role in the attack, the efforts of A Company had been vital, suffering 20 casualties while killing at least 25 PVA and capturing two. Now with Maryang San captured the Australians began digging-in, modifying the south-facing linear PVA trench system into an all-round defensive position with mutually supporting weapons pits. Fully expecting a PVA counter-attack that evening, Hasset moved the Assault Pioneer Platoon to bolster the hasty defences. Meanwhile, the PVA still occupied three key ridgeline positions—the 'Sierra' feature, the 'Hinge' and the summit of Hill 317 itself—which they continued to furiously defend. These would be the scene of considerable fighting in the days to come as the Australians attempted to clear them.

=== The Hinge, 6–8 October 1951 ===
With both sides exhausted from the fighting the night of 5/6 October was less eventful than expected, and the Australians used the opportunity to develop their position. To add further depth to their defences and to probe the PVA positions, Taylor ordered the Australians to capture the central remaining PVA position, the Sierra feature—a wooded knoll halfway between the summit of Maryang San and the Hinge—the next day. Meanwhile, the Fusiliers would renew their attack on Hill 217. The southern approach to Hill 217 had proved to be too strongly defended by the PVA and it became obvious that if it was to be overcome Taylor would need to split the fire of its defenders. To do this the high ground to the north-west of Maryang San, known as the Hinge, would be vital. Indeed, adjacent to Hill 217, the Hinge dominated it from the north. As such for the next assault, planned for the morning, the Fusiliers would detach their reserve company to attack the Hinge from the east, using the Australian positions on Maryang San as a firm base and thereby allowing them to outflank their opponents on Hill 217.

At 07:00 on 6 October, 9 Platoon C Company—under the command of Lieutenant Arthur Pembroke—moved forward to Sierra, using the heavy mist to conceal their movements. Under-strength and not expecting the feature to be occupied, instead the Australians found a large number of PVA in well prepared defensive positions. Without fire support and outnumbered, the Australians immediately conducted a quick attack and, using grenades and bayonets, they inflicted heavy casualties on the PVA before forcing the survivors to withdraw. Although subjected to constant shelling, 9 Platoon continued to hold the knoll, repelling several counterattacks over the next 13 hours, cutting down each assault through the tree-line and long grass with accurate rifle and machine-gun fire, forcing the PVA to withdraw leaving their dead and wounded behind. One Australian was killed in the initial assault on Sierra, while a number were later wounded during the defence. PVA casualties included 19 killed, 30 wounded and seven captured. Pembroke was later awarded the Military Cross.

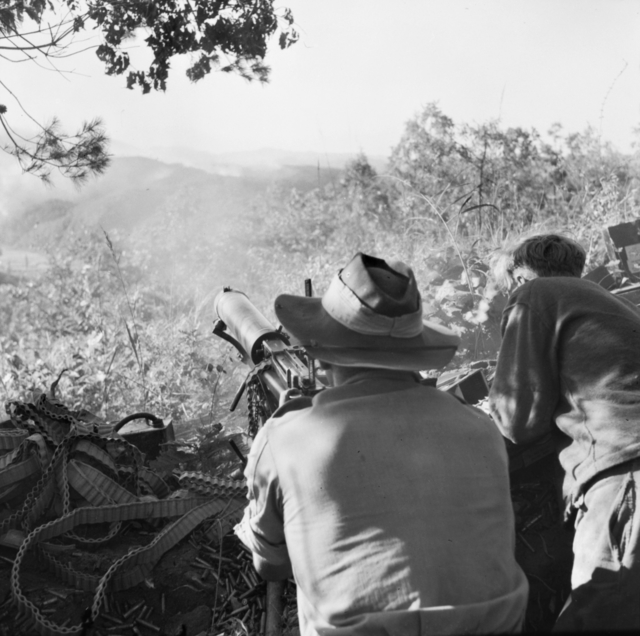
Australian Vickers machine-gunners firing in support of the assault by C Company 3 RAR on Hill 317.

During the day the Fusiliers again assaulted Hill 217 from the south, and attempted to work their way around the eastern and western flanks of the feature. Despite preparation by the divisional artillery and the 3 RAR Machine Gun Platoon firing their Vickers machine guns in support from Maryang San, the Fusiliers were unable to make progress due to PVA machine-guns located in bunkers at the top of their objective. Meanwhile, their flanking movements were also blocked by PVA small arms fire and grenades. 1 RNF had now taken over 100 casualties during two days of fighting and by the afternoon they were a spent force. Sensing the Fusiliers' weakness, the PVA then launched their own assault, forcing them to withdraw in contact. Previous plans for an assault on the Hinge had not occurred due to issues with resupply and the dangerous approach march that would have been required. Again, despite their efforts, the Fusiliers had failed to capture their objective. (Note: 1 RNF was overdue for rotation and many now felt they had done their share of the fighting. Indeed the battalion was the last of the original 29th Brigade battalions, with the other two already having been replaced by fresh battalions from Hong Kong and Great Britain.) It seemed that the only way to finally secure Hill 217 was along the ridge from Hill 317, via the Hinge, and as such the Australians would be tasked with capturing the Hinge the following day. B Company was subsequently allocated the attack. In preparation, they ascended Hill 317 late in the afternoon of 6 October, finally securing the crest, and at last light joined 9 Platoon on the knoll northwest of the summit where they would form up the next day to conduct the assault.

In the early hours of 7 October the allied artillery and mortar bombardment began, targeting PVA positions on the Hinge. Hassett moved the 3 RAR tactical headquarters on to Hill 317 just before the assaulting troops stepped off the line of departure, allowing him to direct the battle from a forward position and to co-ordinate fire support. Waiting for the fog to lift so that the artillery could fire until the last safe moment, the attack finally began at 08:00. B Company moved off down the ridgeline, with two-up and one-in-depth, using the trees and long grass for concealment. Initially it seemed that the PVA had withdrawn during the night, when suddenly the lead Australian platoons were engulfed by small arms fire from their rear. A series of intense fire-fights ensued as the Australians fought back and by 09:20 the Hinge finally fell, with the Australians losing two killed and 20 wounded. PVA casualties included more than 20 killed. As a result of the fighting Captain Henry Nicholls and Lieutenant Jim Hughes were awarded the Military Cross, while Corporal J. Park and Corporal E.F. Bosworth were awarded the Military Medal. Yet even as the surviving PVA withdrew, artillery and mortar fire began to fall on the Hinge. B Company moved quickly to consolidate the position, but were hampered by the shelling, while they now faced a pressing shortage of ammunition and difficulties evacuating their casualties.

For the remainder of the day B Company was subjected to intense indirect fire on the Hinge, as was C Company on Hill 317. The Anti-Tank Platoon and Assault Pioneer Platoon reinforced C Company, with a platoon of C Company moved forward to the Hinge to support B Company. At 20:00 both the Hinge and Hill 317 were again heavily shelled for 45 minutes, heralding the beginning of the inevitable PVA counterattack. Heavy mist concealed the PVA advance, and this assisted many to penetrate the Australian perimeter. Throughout the night of 7/8 October the Hinge was attacked on three occasions from both the front and the flanks by a force of battalion strength, however the Australians beat back the PVA in desperate hand-to-hand combat. The PVA swept forward, but were stopped by intense small arms and artillery fire. During one such assault Sergeant P.J. O'Connell, on seeing one of his platoon's Bren gunners wounded, manned the light machine-gun himself, breaking up a PVA assault, while controlling the fire of the men around him. Meanwhile, Sergeant R.W. Strong arranged the resupply of ammunition to the forward Australian sections. Both were awarded the Military Medal.

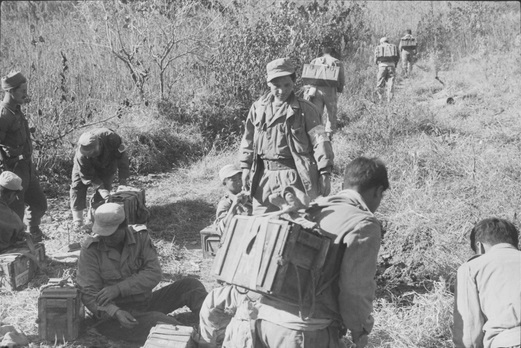
Korean porters supporting 3 RAR

The intensity of the fighting had led to a severe shortage of ammunition among the defenders, and attempts to resupply the Australians were plagued by heavy shelling. The use of salvaged ammunition stabilised the situation momentarily after one of B Company's two Vickers machine-guns was destroyed by PVA shelling, and its ammunition belts were subsequently broken up and dispersed among the riflemen. However, this soon resulted in a large number of mechanical failures and weapon stoppages, causing additional problems for the defenders. The evacuation of casualties was again an issue, and the Assault Pioneer Platoon—commanded by Lieutenant Jock McCormick—was used as stretcher bearers and to run ammunition forward, as were a number of the other specialist platoons. Their ammunition nearly exhausted, the Australians resorted to kicking and strangling many of the attacking PVA during the brutal fighting. Fearing the Australians would be overwhelmed by the persistent PVA attacks, Taylor ordered the Borderers and Shropshires to detach their Korean porters to resupply the Australians, while a full divisional concentration of artillery was fired in support of 3 RAR.

Ultimately, B Company succeeded in holding their hastily constructed defensive positions throughout the night and until 05:00 on 8 October when the PVA finally gave up. In order to preserve its remaining strength, the PVA 191st Division was forced to pull back by 3 kilometres (1.9 mi), surrendering the control of Hill 217 without a fight. At first light more than 120 PVA dead and wounded lay around the Australian defences and in contrast to the savage fighting during the night, PVA stretcher parties were allowed to come forward and collect their wounded under a flag of truce. The Australians had been victorious but were now exhausted after five days of heavy fighting.

== Aftermath ==
=== Casualties ===
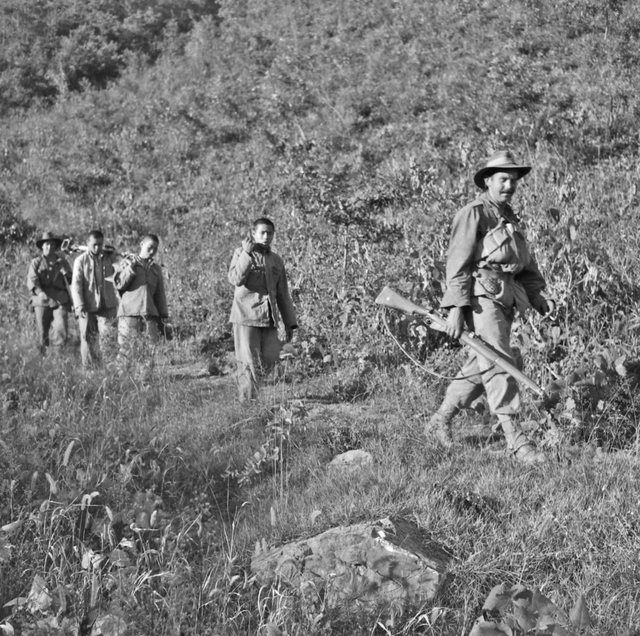
Chinese prisoners captured by Australian soldiers during the UN offensive in October 1951

Four hours later, at 09:00, 3 RAR was relieved on Maryang San and the Hinge by the Borderers, having lost 20 killed and 104 wounded. PVA casualties on Hill 317 had been severe, with 283 killed (determined by body count) and another 50 captured. Later it was estimated that the Australians had destroyed at least two PVA battalions during the five-day battle. 1 RNF once more advanced against Hill 217, this time without opposition, sending patrols to confirm that the PVA had withdrawn. They were met by patrols from 1 KOSB on the Hinge, with the Borderers taking control of the area at 11:00. Hill 217 was later occupied on 9 October by the Borderers. The 3 RAR Assault Pioneer Platoon, the Anti-Tank Platoon and a platoon from C Company remained on Maryang San however, and during the evening of 8/9 October the Pioneers killed four PVA during a probe on their position. They were finally relieved on 9 October. For his leadership, Hassett was immediately awarded the DSO, while a number of awards were also made to others that had distinguished themselves during the fighting. (Note: Total Australian decorations included two DSOs, nine MCs, one MBE, two DCMs, nine MMs, and fifteen Mentions in Despatches.) The Royal Australian Regiment was subsequently granted the battle honours "Kowang-San" and "Maryang San". (Note: Originally the Royal Australian Regiment was awarded the honour "Kowang-San" and this honour acknowledged the regiment's involvement in actions from 3–9 October 1951 that resulted in the capture of the Kowang-San area, including the fighting at Maryang San. In 1994, Maryang San which was declared a separate battle honour.) Today, the First Battle of Maryang San is widely regarded as one of the Australian Army's greatest accomplishments of the Korean War.

=== Assessment ===
During the battle, the British Commonwealth logistic system proved robust enough to bear the strain of the fighting without serious disruption, although problems were experienced. Despite difficulties, an adequate flow of ammunition, equipment, food and water was maintained, although there were occasions when the Australians endured thirst and hunger for several hours. 3 RAR used 900,000 rounds of small arms, 5,000 grenades and 7,000 mortar rounds during the five-day battle, all of which was moved in man-packable loads by Korean Service Corps porters and Australian soldiers over long distances and extreme terrain, often while under fire. These resupply operations had required considerable effort and bravery to effect, and a number of Korean porters were killed and wounded at Maryang San. Indeed, the evacuation of casualties and the resupply of ammunition at times proved problematic, and heavy shelling and sniper fire disrupted stretcher parties and porters on a number of occasions, resulting in the forward companies running short of ammunition. Meanwhile, the quality of support given to the British and Australian infantry by the artillery and tanks was of a high standard and proved a critical factor. The tanks had often operated in terrain to which they were unsuited, while the New Zealand gunners had fired over 50,000 rounds in direct support of 3 RAR, blistering the paint off the barrels of their guns. Air support, including that provided by the South African Mustangs, had been important throughout.

The battle was also noted for the pioneering use of tunnel warfare by the PVA in the Korean War. During the fighting, a PVA company had defended their positions from a U-shaped tunnel capable of housing 100 men, which had served as both a bomb shelter and a base for counterattacks. The company leader later claimed that the tunnel enabled the defenders to inflict 700 UN casualties while suffering only 21 casualties in return. Impressed by the report, the PVA commander Peng Dehuai, later ordered the construction of 30-metre (98 ft) deep tunnels along the entire front line, and it formed a formidable obstacle for UN forces to overcome during the stalemate period.

=== Subsequent operations ===
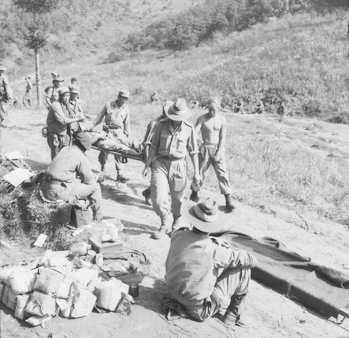
Australian casualties being evacuated during Operation Commando, October 1951

Operation Commando finally ended on 15 October with the US I Corps having successfully seized the Jamestown Line and destroying elements of the PVA 42nd, 47th, 64th and 65th Armies. PVA losses were estimated at 21,000 casualties, while UN losses were 4,000—the majority of them in the US 1st Cavalry Division which had borne the brunt of the fighting. Although a few hills south of the line remained in PVA/KPA hands—requiring a follow-up operation known as Operation Polecharge which succeeded in capturing these positions by 19 October—UN supply lines near Seoul were now free from PVA interdiction. With the peace-talks ongoing, these operations proved to be last actions in the war of manoeuvre, which had lasted the previous sixteen months. It was replaced by a static war characterised by fixed defences, trench lines, bunkers, patrols, wiring parties and minefields reminiscent of the Western Front in 1915–17. Construction of defensive localities began almost immediately, although such operations were confined to the reverse slopes during the day due to artillery and mortar fire which made such operations hazardous. Patrolling forward of the Jamestown Line also began in order to prevent the PVA from gaining control of no man's land. Yet even as the war became a contest of positional warfare and attrition, growing western political sensitivities ensured that UN commanders were increasingly mindful of limiting casualties.

Total casualties among the 1st Commonwealth Division during Operation Commando amounted to 58 killed and 262 wounded, the bulk of which had occurred during the fighting for Hill 217 and Hill 317. (Note: The Chinese estimates of the 1st Commonwealth Division's casualties were 2,600 killed or wounded.) In addition to the heavy casualties suffered by 3 RAR, 1 RNF had lost 16 killed and 94 wounded. (Note: The KOSBs and KSLI together lost 28 killed and 83 wounded during their attacks on Hill 355 and 227. In contrast the Canadians had completed the operation relatively unscathed, losing 4 killed and 28 wounded after the PVA withdrew prior to their assault. Two New Zealand gunners were also killed by PVA counter-battery fire.) The PVA 64th Army later received a commendation for keeping their casualties "light", despite some estimates placing its casualties at higher than 3,000. Throughout the operation 3 RAR had played a crucial role, and in a bold series of holding and flanking movements, coordinated with accurate and sustained artillery and direct tank fire, it had driven the PVA from both Kowang-San and Maryang San. They had then held the key position against several unsuccessful counterattacks before forcing the PVA to retire. A month later Maryang San was subsequently retaken by the PVA from the Borderers amid fierce fighting at the Second Battle of Maryang San, for which Private Bill Speakman was later awarded the Victoria Cross. It was not re-gained, and remained in PVA hands until the end of the war. (Note: The battle honour "Maryang San" was also subsequently awarded to the King's Own Scottish Borders and the Royal Leicestershire Regiment for their actions in early-November during the loss and subsequent attempts to regain the feature, known as the Second Battle of Maryang San.)

== See also ==
- Second Battle of Maryang-san

== Notes ==
Footnotes

Citations
