= Wellington School, Timperley =

Wellington School
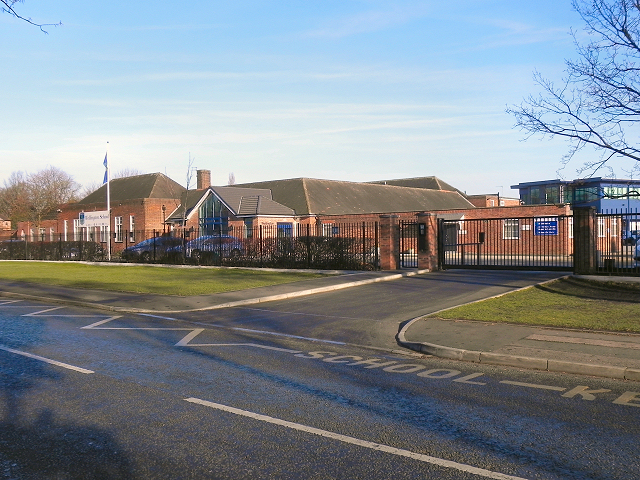

Location
- Wellington Road; Timperley; Greater Manchester, WA15 7RH; England
- Coordinates: 53.3941°N 2.3349°W

Information
- Type: Academy
- Local authority: Trafford Council
- Trust: Wellington School as of September 2020
- Department for Education URN: 136377 Tables
- Ofsted: Reports
- Headteacher: Stuart Beeley
- Gender: Mixed
- Age: 11 to 18
- Enrolment: 1443
- Capacity: 1350
- Website: http://www.wellington.trafford.sch.uk/

Wellington School is a mixed secondary school and sixth form with academy status. It is located in Timperley in the English county of Greater Manchester. With many primary schools (such as Willows and St Vincent's Primary), surrounding it.

Previously a foundation school administered by Trafford Metropolitan Borough Council, Wellington School converted to academy status on 1 April 2011. However the school continues to coordinate with Trafford Metropolitan Borough Council for admissions, having a non-selective intake.

Wellington School offers GCSEs as programmes of study for pupils, while students in the sixth form have the option to study from a range of A-levels.

== Notable former pupils ==
- Bill Speakman VC - recipient of the Victoria Cross
- Rob King - Britain's Got Talent semi-finalist
