= 5th Armoured Brigade (People's Republic of China) =

5th Tank Division (1967–98) Armored Brigade, 40th Army (1998–2011) 5th Armored Brigade (2011–17)
- Active: 1969–2017
- Country: China
- Type: Armored
- Size: Division
- Garrison/HQ: Fuxin, Liaoning province

The 5th Tank Division (Chinese: 坦克第5师) was formed on April 1, 1969 from 323rd Tank Self-Propelled Artillery Regiment from 118th Army Division, 324th Tank Self-Propelled Artillery Regiment from 119th Army Division, 325th Tank Self-Propelled Artillery Regiment from 120th Army Division and 396th Tank Self-Propelled Artillery Regiment from 191st Army Division.

On August 19, 1969, the division was composed of:

- 17th Tank Regiment (former 323rd Tank Self-Propelled Artillery Regiment);
- 18th Tank Regiment (former 324th Tank Self-Propelled Artillery Regiment);
- 19th Tank Regiment (former 325th Tank Self-Propelled Artillery Regiment);
- 3rd Independent Tank Regiment (former 396th Tank Self-Propelled Artillery Regiment).

In December 1969, 3rd Independent Tank Regiment was detached from the division, and in January 1970 2nd Crew Training Tank Regiment was attached to the division and renamed as 20th Tank Regiment.

In the 1970s the division maintained as a tank division, catalogue B, which consisted of 4 under-equipped tank regiments.

In March 1976 19th Tank Regiment detached and renamed Tank Regiment, 40th Army Corps.

In September 1981 Armored Infantry Regiment and Artillery Regiment were activated. On January 1, 1983, the division was put under command of 40th Army Corps.

By then the division was composed of:

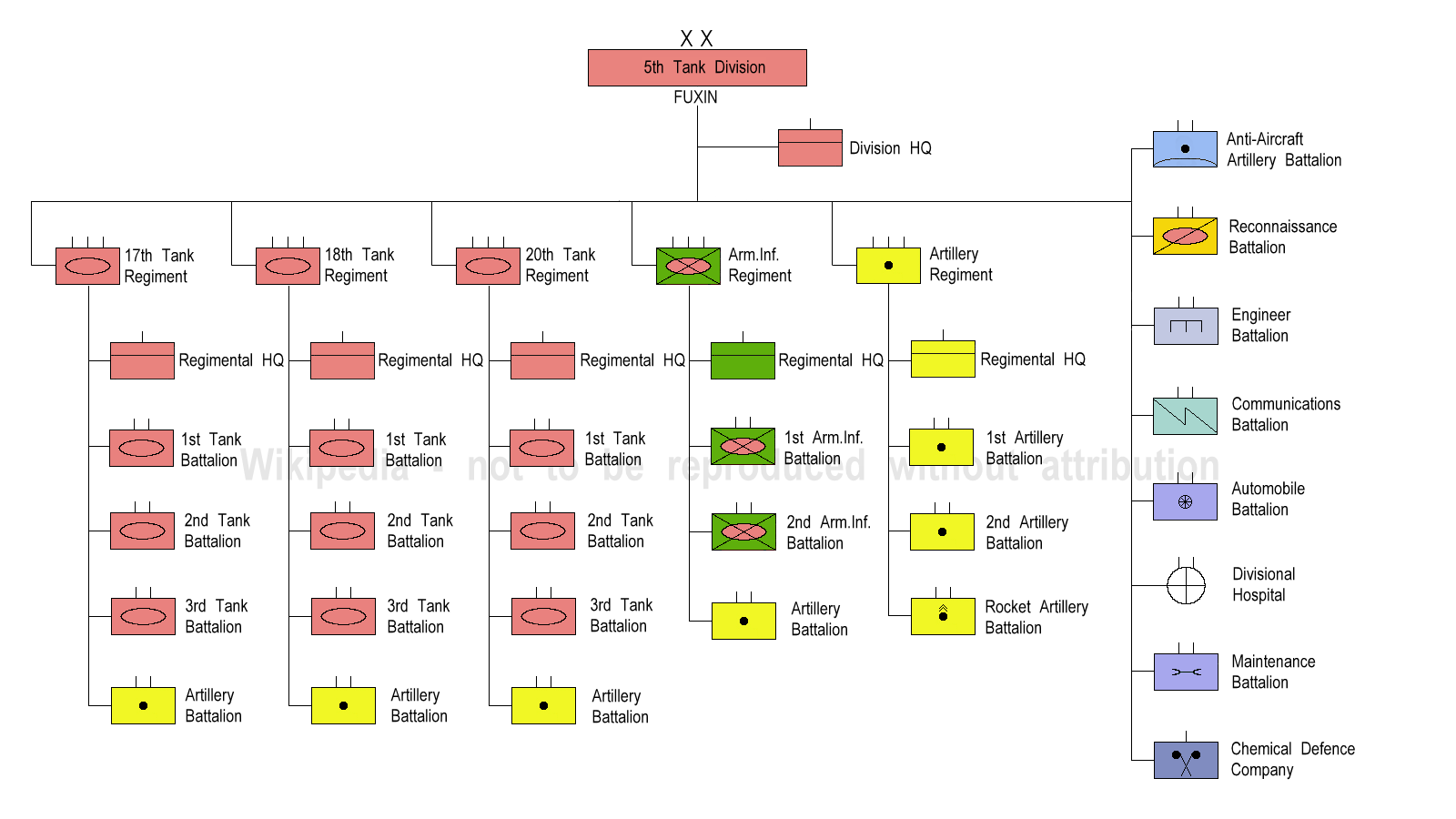
5th Tank Division, Organization from 1984 to 1998.

- 17th Tank Regiment;
- 18th Tank Regiment;
- 20th Tank Regiment;
- Armored Infantry Regiment;
- Artillery Regiment.

In January 1984 18th Tank Regiment was detached and transferred to 117th Army Division as Tank Regiment, 117th Army Division. In April, division re-activated a new 18th Tank Regiment. Antiaircraft Artillery Regiment activated.

In 1985 the division was attached to 40th Army. In September, 18th Tank Regiment absorbed Tank Regiment, 12th Garrison Division of Shenyang Military Region. On October 1, 17 Tank Regiment was detached and transferred to 118th Infantry Division, and Tank Regiment, 40th Army Corps was attached again as 19th Tank Regiment.

By then the division was composed of:

- 18th Tank Regiment;
- 19th Tank Regiment;
- 20th Tank Regiment;
- Armored Infantry Regiment;
- Artillery Regiment.

The division was inactivated in 1998. Its 18th Tank Regiment merged with 93rd Infantry Regiment, 31st Motorized Infantry Division and became Armored Regiment, 31st Motorized Infantry Division; its 19th Tank Regiment merged with 120th Infantry Regiment, 40th Motorized Infantry Division and became Armored Regiment, 40th Motorized Infantry Brigade.

The remnant of the division was re-organized as Armored Brigade, 40th Army(Chinese: 第40集团军装甲旅). In late 2011 the brigade was renamed as 5th Armored Brigade(Chinese: 装甲第5旅).

In 2017, its organizational structure was disbanded.
