= Bill Speakman =

British soldier, recipient of the Victoria Cross (1927–2018)

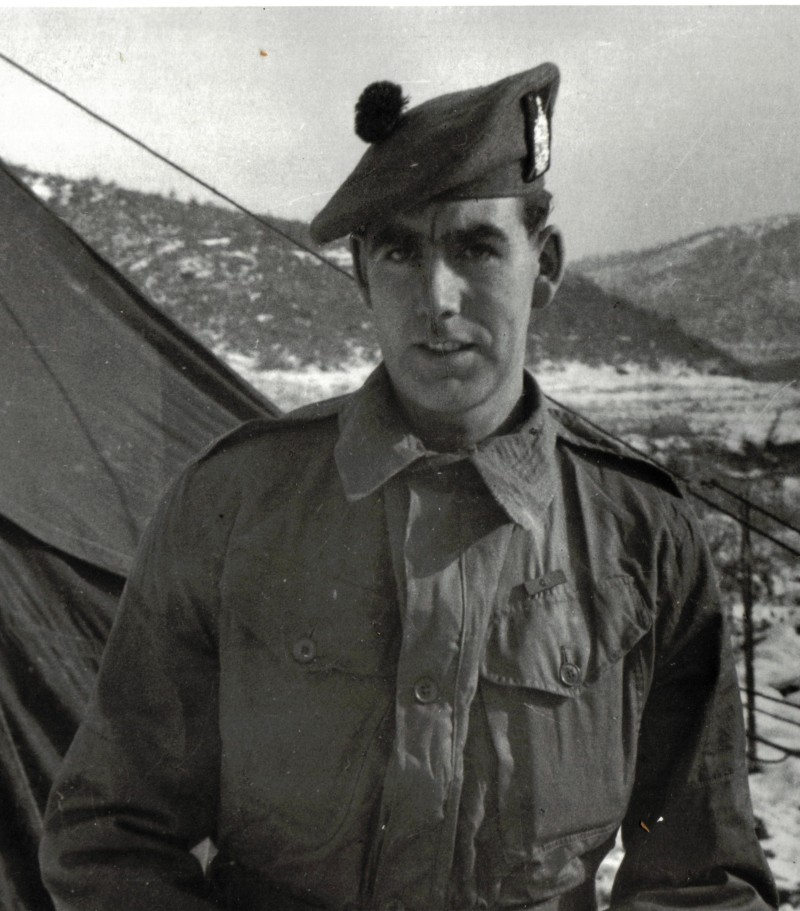
- Private Speakman in Korea
- Born: 21 September 1927; Altrincham, Cheshire, England
- Died: 20 June 2018 (aged 90); London, England
- Burial place: United Nations Memorial Cemetery, Republic of Korea
- Military career
- Allegiance: United Kingdom
- Branch: British Army
- Service years: 1945–1968
- Rank: Sergeant
- Nickname: "Big Bill"
- Service number: 14471590
- Units: Black Watch; King's Own Scottish Borderers (att'h); Special Air Service
- Conflicts: Second World War; Korean War; Malayan Emergency; Indonesian Confrontation; Aden Emergency
- Awards: Victoria Cross; Taegeuk Cordon of the Order of Military Merit (South Korea)

William Speakman-Pitt, VC (21 September 1927 – 20 June 2018), known as Bill Speakman, was a British Army soldier and a recipient of the Victoria Cross, the highest award for gallantry in the face of the enemy that can be awarded to British and Commonwealth forces. He was the first person to receive an honour from Queen Elizabeth II.

== Military career ==
Speakman was born and brought up in Altrincham, Cheshire, and educated at Wellington Road School, Timperley.

He was 24 years old and a private in the Black Watch (Royal Highland Regiment), British Army, attached to the 1st Battalion, King's Own Scottish Borderers during the Korean War when the following deed took place at United Hill, for which he was awarded the VC. At dusk on 4 November 1951, during the Second Battle of Maryang-san, on the ridge known as Hill 217 in Marysang-san, the section holding the left shoulder of the company's position had been seriously depleted by casualties and was being overrun by the enemy. Speakman, on his own initiative, filled his pockets with grenades and went forward, pelting the Chinese with them. Having thrown all of the grenades he had, he returned for more. Inspired by his actions, six men joined him in collecting a pile of grenades and followed him in a series of charges. He broke up several enemy attacks, causing heavy casualties and, despite being wounded in the leg and the shoulder, continued to lead charge after charge. When they ran low on ammunition, they had to resort to throwing stones and ration tins and, according to legend, beer bottles. The enemy was kept at bay long enough to enable his company to withdraw safely. The press nicknamed him the 'beer-bottle VC,' something he disliked for fear that it suggested he and his colleagues drank beer while on duty; the beer was in fact used to cool gun barrels.

Although his award was made by King George VI, Speakman was the first VC invested by Queen Elizabeth II.

Whilst serving in Malaya (with the Special Air Service), Borneo and Radfan, he was promoted to sergeant. In Malaya, he was involved in finding and returning the bodies of two soldiers killed in a clash with communist insurgents in the jungle.

Standing 6 feet 6 inches (1.98 m) tall, he was nicknamed "Big Bill".

== Later life ==
Due to financial hardship, Speakman sold his original VC, using the money to put a new roof on his cottage, but later bought a replacement to wear. His Victoria Cross is displayed in the National War Museum of Scotland in Edinburgh Castle. He was interviewed for the 2006 television docudrama Victoria Cross Heroes, which also included archive footage and dramatisations of his actions.

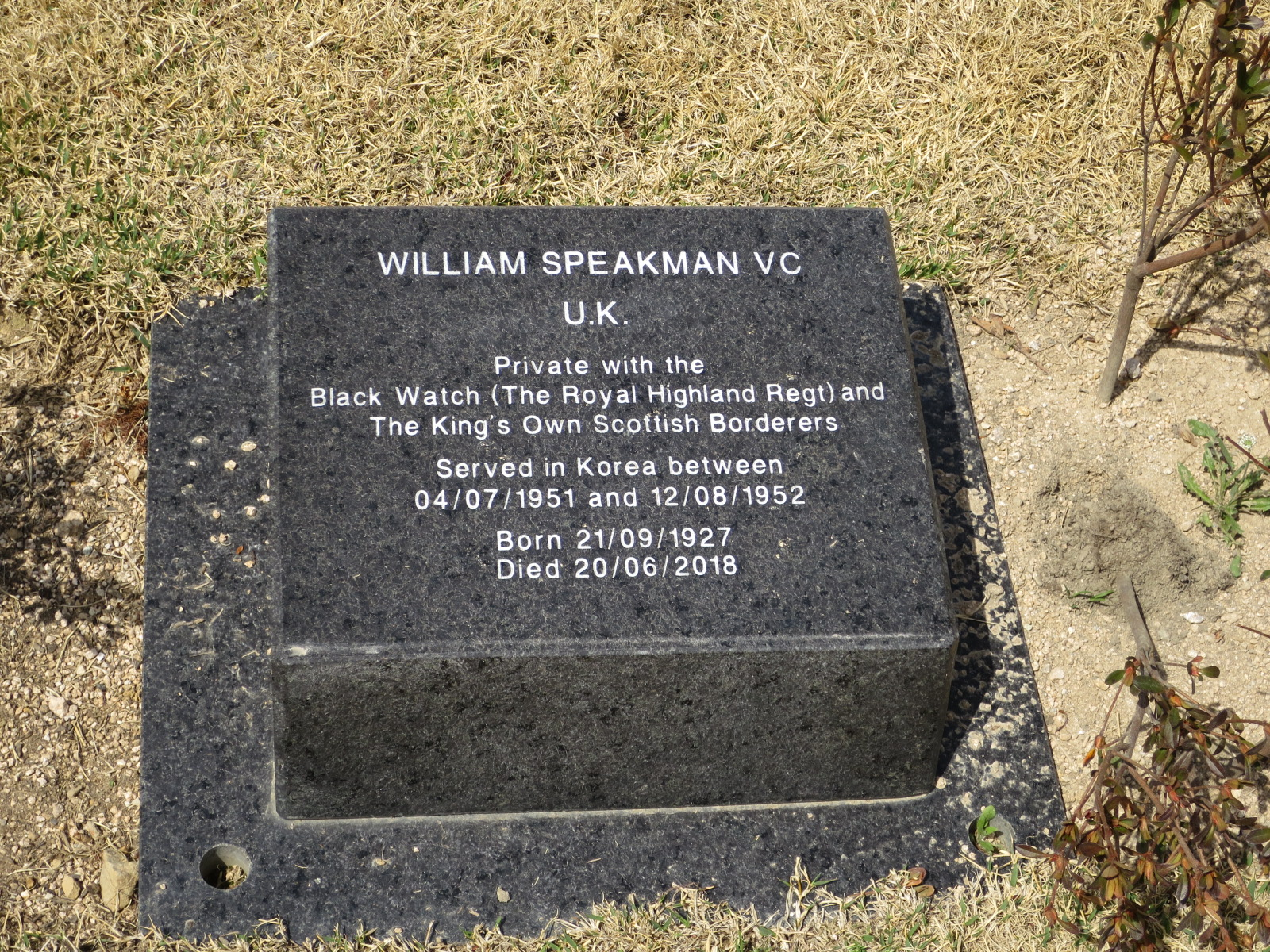
Speakman's grave at the UN Memorial Cemetery

In a ceremony held in Seoul on 21 April 2015 for visiting veterans of the Korean War, Speakman gave a replica of his Victoria Cross and other medals to the people and government of South Korea. He became an in-pensioner of the Royal Hospital Chelsea, and died on 20 June 2018. His ashes were buried in the United Nations Memorial Cemetery, South Korea on 19 February 2019.
