= Chen Cheng-siang =

Chinese geographer

Chen Cheng-siang (simplified Chinese: 陈正祥; traditional Chinese: 陳正祥; pinyin: Chén Zhèngxiáng) (1922 – 2003) was a Chinese geographer from the Republic of China.

He was professor of geography and director of the Geographical Research Center at the Chinese University of Hong Kong and Taiwan University of Republic of China. He wrote the entry on China for Encyclopædia Britannica.

== Works ==
- Taiwan: An Economic and Social Geography (台灣地誌)
- Economic geography and geology of Guangdong province (廣東地誌, Cosmo book shop, Hong Kong, 1978)
- Yangtze River and Yellow River (長江與黃河, Commercial Press Publishing House, Hong Kong, December 1978 )
