= 191st Motorized Infantry Brigade =

Chinese military unit

191st Division (1949-53) 191st Infantry Division (1953-60) 191st Army Division (1960-85) 191st Infantry Division (1985-98) 191st Motorized Infantry Brigade (1998-2017) 191st Light Combined Arms Brigade (2017-)
- Active: 1949.2 -
- Country: People's Republic of China
- Branch: People's Liberation Army Ground Force, People's Volunteer Army
- Type: Combined Arms
- Size: Brigade
- Part of: 79th Group Army
- Garrison/HQ: Dandong, Liaoning (before 2003)
- Engagements: Chinese Civil War, Korean War, Sino-Soviet border conflict, Vietnam War

The 191st Division (Chinese: 第191师) was created in February 1949 under the Regulation of the Redesignations of All Organizations and Units of the Army, issued by Central Military Commission on November 1, 1948, basing on the 11th Brigade, 4th Column of Huabei Military Region. Its history could be traced back to 3rd Military Sub-district of Jinchaji Military Region, formed in November 1937.

The division was a part of 64th Corps. Under the flag of 191st division it took part in the Chinese Civil War.

The division was composed of 571st, 572nd and 573rd Infantry Regiments. In December 1950 Artillery Regiment, 191st Division was activated, and redesignated as 571st Artillery Regiment in 1953.

In January 1951 the division converted to Soviet-built small arms. After soon the division moved into Korea as a part of People's Volunteer Army in February 1951. In October and November the division took part in the First and Second Battle of Maryang San.

In August 1953, the division pulled out of Korea and renamed as the 191st Infantry Division (Chinese: 步兵第191师). The division stationed in Dandong, Liaoning province since then.

In May 1954, 387th Tank Self-Propelled Artillery Regiment of 182nd Infantry Division was attached to the division and renamed as 396th Tank Self-Propelled Artillery Regiment. The division was then composed of:

- 571st Infantry Regiment;
- 572nd Infantry Regiment;
- 573rd Infantry Regiment;
- 571st Artillery Regiment;
- 396th Tank Self-Propelled Artillery Regiment.

In February 1955, the division, along with the rest of 64th Corps moved to Port Arthur to receive equipment left by the withdrawing Soviet Union. The division received equipment left by 17th Guards Rifle Division, and then stationed in Jinzhou District.

In April 1960 the division was renamed as the 191st Army Division (Chinese: 陆军第191师). In June 1962, the division was catalogued as a "big" division (northern, catalogue A).

In June 1963 the division moved to Dandong, Liaoning again.

From January to August 1968, Anti-Aircraft Artillery Battalion, 191st Army Division moved to North Vietnam to take part in the Vietnam War. On March 28 the battalion shot down 2 F-4C fighters. However this claim could not be confirmed by U.S. sources.

In September 1968, 396th Tank Self-Propelled Artillery Regiment detached from the division and was transferred to 5th Tank Division as 3rd Independent Tank Regiment.

In late 1969, 571st Artillery Regiment was renamed as Artillery Regiment, 191st Army Division. The division was then composed of:

- 571st Infantry Regiment;
- 572nd Infantry Regiment;
- 573rd Infantry Regiment;
- Artillery Regiment.

From November 1968 to May 1970, Reconnaissance Company, 191st Army Division, along with 75-mm Recoilless Rifle Battery, 572nd Infantry Regiment, took part in reconnaissance missions in Zhenbao Island area, securing the left flank of the island. However element of the division did not participate in the direct fire fight during the Zhenbao Island Incident, March 1969. In the 1970s the division maintained as a catalogue B unit.

In September 1985, the division was renamed as the 191st Infantry Division (Chinese: 步兵第191师) again. From 1985 to 1998 the division maintained as a northern infantry division, catalogue B. 571st and 573rd Regiments were converted to training unit until 1989, when they were further converted to combat units.

In July 1998, after the disbandment of 64th Army, the division was transferred to Liaoning Provincial Military District's control. Soon in October the division was reduced as the 191st Motorized Infantry Brigade (Chinese: 摩托化步兵第191旅).

In 2003 the brigade was transferred to 40th Army's control.

In 2017 the brigade was reorganized as the 191st Light Combined Arms Brigade (Chinese: 轻型合成第191旅) and transferred to the 79th Group Army following 40th's disbandment.
