= 190th Mechanized Infantry Brigade =

Chinese military unit

190th Division (1949–55) 1st Mechanized Division (1955–60) 190th Army Division (1960–85) 190th Motorized Infantry Division (1985–2003) 190th Mechanized Infantry Brigade (2003–17) 190th Heavy Combined Arms Brigade (2017–)
- Active: 1949.1 - Present
- Country: People's Republic of China
- Allegiance: Chinese Communist Party
- Branch: People's Liberation Army Ground Force, People's Volunteer Army
- Type: Combined Arms, Mechanized Infantry
- Part of: 79th Group Army
- Garrison/HQ: Benxi, Liaoning
- Nickname: Rainstorm division (Chinese: 暴风雨师)
- Engagements: Chinese Civil War, Korean War, Sino-Soviet Border Conflict

Commanders
- Notable commanders: Liu Jingsong; Wang Guosheng

The 190th Heavy Combined Arms Brigade is a military formation of the People's Liberation Army of the People's Republic of China. It is famous for being the first mechanized PLA division.

The 190th Division (Chinese: 第190师) was created in January 1949 under the Regulation of the Redesignations of All Organizations and Units of the Army, issued by Central Military Commission on November 1, 1948, basing on the 10th Brigade, 4th Column of Jinchaji Military Region. Its history can be traced to the 4th Military Sub-district of Jinchaji Military Region formed in November 1937. Under the command of 64th Corps it took part in many major battles during the Chinese Civil War.

In February 1951 it moved into Korea to take part in the Korean War under the command of the Corps. Since then it became a part of the People's Volunteer Army until August 1953.

In January 1953 the 395th Tank Self-propelled Artillery Regiment was formed and attached to the division.

By then the division was composed of:

- 568th Infantry Regiment;
- 569th Infantry Regiment;
- 570th Infantry Regiment;
- 395th Tank Self-Propelled Artillery Regiment;
- 570th Artillery Regiment;

In February 1955, when the 39th Army of Soviet Union pulled out from Lüda region, 190th division was ordered to take over the equipment left by Soviet 7th Mechanized Division and renamed the 1st Mechanized Division (Chinese: 第1机械化师) and detached from the 64th Corps.

The division received 137 medium tanks (mainly T-34/85s, with some T-54s), 22 IS-2 heavy tanks, 24 SU-100, 45 ISU-152, 23 Armored vehicles, 110 artillery pieces and 878 motor vehicles.

By then the division was composed of:

- 1st Mechanized Regiment (former 568th Regiment) -- received equipment from 17th Mechanized Regiment;
- 2nd Mechanized Regiment (former 569th Regiment) -- received equipment from 63rd Mechanized Regiment;
- 3rd Mechanized Regiment (former 570th Regiment) -- received equipment from 64th Mechanized Regiment;
- 31st Tank Regiment (former 395th Tank Self-Propelled Artillery Regiment) -- received equipment from 41st Guards Tank Regiment;
- 32nd Tank Regiment (former Independent Tank Regiment of Huabei Military Region) -- received equipment from 55th Heavy Tank Self-Propelled Artillery Regiment;
- 1st Howitzer Artillery Regiment (former 170th Artillery Regiment of 63rd Army Corps);
- 2nd Artillery Regiment (former 570th Artillery Regiment);
- Antiaircraft Artillery Regiment (newly formed).

In August 1961 32nd Tank Regiment and 1st Howitzer Artillery Regiment detached from the division. All tank battalions in mechanized regiments maintained, and mechanized regiments were renamed motorized regiments. The 1st Mechanized Division was renamed as the 190th Army Division (Chinese: 陆军第190师) and returned to the 64th Army Corps's control. After that, the division maintained as a motorized army division.

By then the division was composed of:

- 568th Motorized Infantry Regiment (former 1st Mechanized Regiment);
- 569th Motorized Infantry Regiment (former 2nd Mechanized Regiment);
- 570th Motorized Infantry Regiment (former 3rd Mechanized Regiment);
- 395th Tank Self-Propelled Artillery Regiment (former 31st Tank Regiment);
- 570th Artillery Regiment (former 2nd Artillery Regiment);
- Antiaircraft Artillery Regiment.

From November 1968 to May 1970, Reconnaissance Company, 190th Army Division moved to Zhenbao Island for up-coming border conflict with the Soviet Army. However, the company did not take part in direct engagement.

In August 1969 395th Tank Self-Propelled Artillery Regiment was renamed Tank Regiment, 190th Division. 570th Artillery Regiment was renamed as Artillery Regiment, 190th Army Division. The division was not further affected in the re-designation during December 1969.

In 1985 the division was renamed the 190th Motorized Infantry Division (Chinese: 摩托化步兵第190师), as a northern motorized infantry division, category A, while its 568th Regiment became mechanized infantry.

The division took part in the enforced martial law and the crackdown on protests in Beijing, June 1989.

In 1992, tank battalions of the 569th and 570th infantry regiments were disbanded.

In 1998 the division was reorganized as a motorized division: its 569th Motorized Infantry Regiment was disbanded. The Tank Regiment was renamed Armored Regiment. As 64th Army was disbanded, the division was transferred to the 39th Army.

By then the division was composed of:

- 568th Mechanized Infantry Regiment;
- 570th Motorized Infantry Regiment;
- Armored Regiment;
- Artillery Regiment;
- Antiaircraft Artillery Regiment.

In 2003 the division was reduced to brigade-size and renamed as the 190th Mechanized Infantry Brigade (Chinese: 机械化步兵第190旅).

In 2017 the brigade was reorganized as the 190th Heavy Combined Arms Brigade (Chinese: 重型合成第190旅).
