= LXXII Corps =

LXXII Corps or 72nd Corps may refer to:

- LXXII Army Corps, Wehrmacht, Germany
- 72nd Guards Fighter Aviation Corps, Soviet Union
- 72nd (Fine Arts) Lanarkshire Rifle Volunteer Corps, United Kingdom

== See also ==
- List of military corps by number
- 72nd Brigade (disambiguation)
- 72nd Division (disambiguation)
- 72nd Regiment (disambiguation)
- 72nd (disambiguation)
