= 72nd =

72nd is the ordinal form of the number 72. 72nd or Seventy-second may also refer to:

- A fraction, 1/72, equal to one of 72 equal parts

== Geography ==
- 72nd meridian east, a line of longitude
- 72nd meridian west, a line of longitude
- 72nd parallel north, a circle of latitude
- 72nd parallel south, a circle of latitude
- 72nd Street (disambiguation)

== Military ==
- 72nd Group Army, People's Republic of China
- 72nd Brigade (disambiguation)
- 72nd Division (disambiguation)
- 72nd Regiment (disambiguation)

== Other ==
- 72nd century
- 72nd century BC

== See also ==
- 72 (disambiguation)
