= J72 =

J72 may refer to:

- Gyrate rhombicosidodecahedron
- LNER Class J72, a British steam locomotive class
- Panther J72, a British luxury automobile

== See also ==
- Chengdu J-7 II "Fishcan", Chinese jet fighter plane series variant of the MiG-21
- 72 (disambiguation)
- J (disambiguation)
