= M72 =

M72 or M-72 may refer to:

== Places ==
- Messier 72, a globular cluster in the constellation Aquarius
- M-72 (Michigan highway), a state highway in Michigan, USA
- M72 (Johannesburg), a road in South Africa

== Weaponry ==
- M72 LAW, a United States Army anti-tank weapon
- Mecar M72, a Belgian hand grenade
- Zastava M72, a Yugoslav copy of the RPK machine gun

== Other uses ==
- BMW M72 V-12 engine
- Dnepr M-72, a combat motorcycle built in the Soviet Union
- M72 (New York City bus), a New York City Bus route in Manhattan
- M72 World Tour, a concert tour by Metallica

== See also ==
- 72 (disambiguation)
