= Heckler & Koch MP5 =

German submachine gun

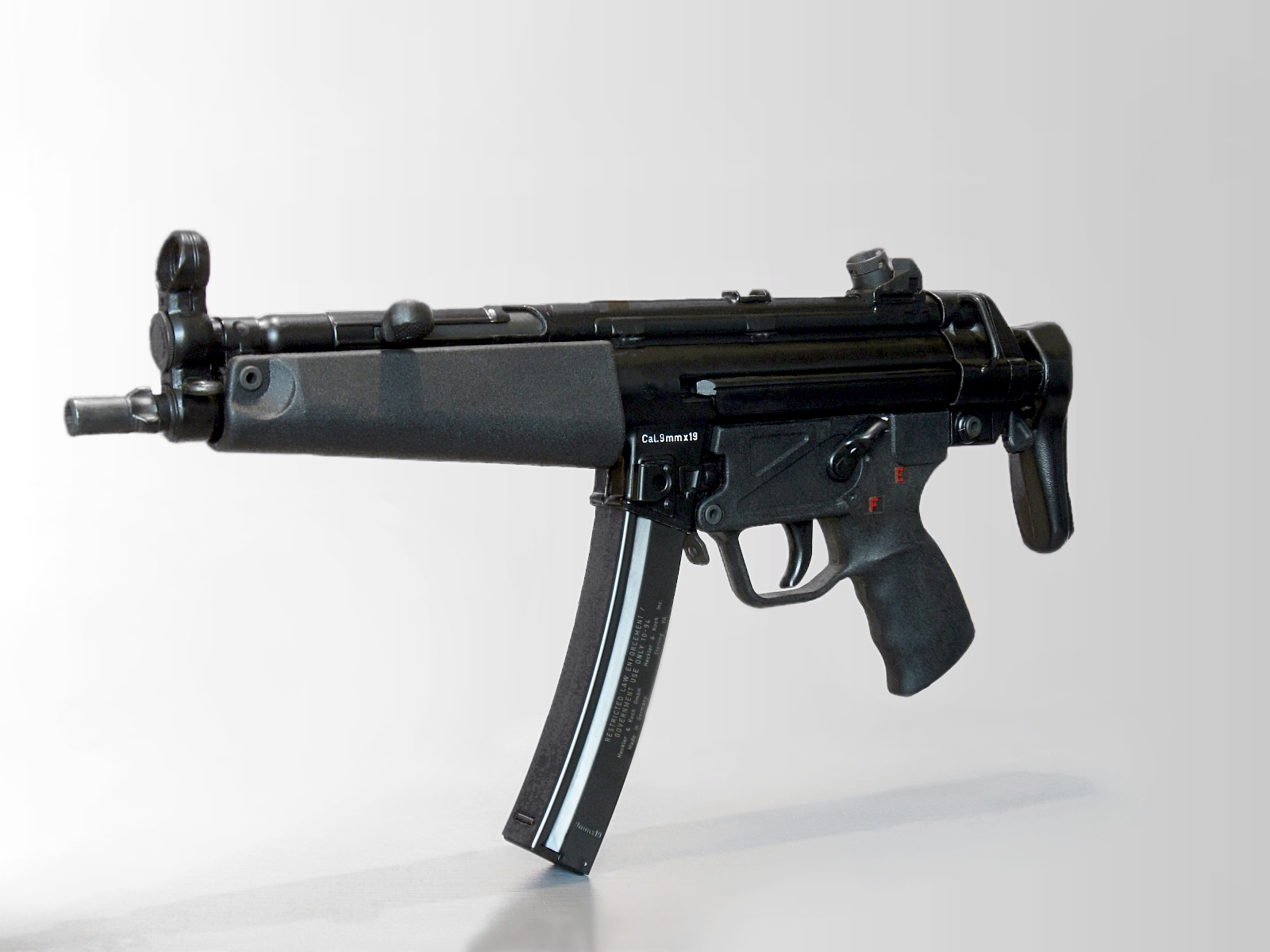
- Heckler & Koch MP5A3
- Type: Submachine gun Pistol-calibre carbine (MP5SF, HK94, SP5, MP5 .22 LR); Pistol (SP89, SP5K)
- Place of origin: West Germany

Service history
- In service: 1966–present
- Used by: See Users
- Wars: The Troubles; Operation Marajoara; Western Sahara War; Operation Feuerzauber; Operation Storm-333; Soviet–Afghan War; Iranian Embassy siege; Operation Eagle Claw; Lebanese Civil War; Internal conflict in Peru; Colombian conflict; Sri Lankan Civil War; Afghan Civil War (1989-1992); Yugoslav Wars; Gulf War; War in Afghanistan (2001–2021); Iraq War; Mexican drug war; Armed conflict for control of the favelas; Boko Haram insurgency; Libyan Civil War; 2013 Lahad Datu standoff; Russian invasion of Ukraine; Banjska attack

Production history
- Designer: Tilo Möller, Manfred Guhring, Georg Seidl, Helmut Baureuter
- Designed: 1964–1966
- Manufacturer: Heckler & Koch
- Produced: 1966–present
- Variants: See Variants

Specifications
- Mass: 2.54 kg (5.6 lb); 2.00 kg (4.41 lb) (MP5K)
- Length: 680 mm (27 in); 325 mm (12.8 in) (MP5K)
- Barrel length: 225 mm (8.9 in); 115 mm (4.5 in) (MP5K)
- Width: 50 mm (2.0 in)
- Height: 260 mm (10.2 in)
- Cartridge: 9×19mm Parabellum; 10mm Auto (MP5/10).40 S&W (MP5/40).22 LR (MP5 .22 LR)
- Action: Roller-delayed blowback, closed bolt
- Rate of fire: 800 rounds/min 900 rounds/min (MP5K); 700 rounds/min (MP5SD)
- Muzzle velocity: 400 m/s (1,312 ft/s)
- Effective firing range: 200 m (656 ft)
- Feed system: 15-, 30-, 40-, or 50-round detachable box magazine, 50-round drum magazine and 100-round Beta C-Mag drum magazine
- Sights: Iron sights. Rear: rotary drum; front: hooded post

The Heckler & Koch MP5 (German: Maschinenpistole 5, lit. 'Submachine gun 5') is a submachine gun developed in the 1960s by German firearms manufacturer Heckler & Koch. It uses a similar modular design to the Heckler & Koch G3, and has over 100 variants and clones, including select fire, semi-automatic, suppressed, compact and even marksman variants. The MP5 is one of the most widely used submachine guns in the world, having been adopted by over forty nations and numerous militaries, police forces, intelligence agencies, security organizations, paramilitaries and non-state actors.

Attempts at replacing the MP5 by Heckler & Koch began in the 1980s, but despite functional prototypes having promising performance, a formal successor did not enter commercial production until 1999, when the Heckler & Koch UMP was developed. However, despite being more expensive, the MP5 remained the more successful of the two designs, because of its preexisting widespread use, design familiarity and lower recoil due to its roller-delayed action as opposed to the UMP's straight blowback action.

== History ==
Heckler & Koch, encouraged by the success of the G3 Rifle in 1959, developed a family of small arms consisting of four types of firearms all based on a common G3 design layout and operating principle. The first type was chambered for 7.62×51mm NATO, the second for 7.62×39mm M43, the third for 5.56×45mm NATO and the fourth for 9×19mm Parabellum. The MP5 was created for the fourth type as the HK54; under the HK naming system, this categorizes it as a selective fire carbine chambered in a handgun cartridge.

Development began in 1964, and in 1966 the HK54 was adopted by the Bundesgrenzschutz and by Bundeswehr special forces, initially as the MP64, before being redesignated as the MP5. The MP5A1 was introduced in the late 1960s and was the first model to feature the front ring sight and "Slimline" handguard. In 1970, the MP5 and MP5A1 were superseded by the MP5A2 and MP5A3, improvements to the MP5A1 with a fixed stock and retracting stock respectively. In 1974, the MP5SD, an integrally-suppressed variant, was introduced, and in 1976, the MP5K, a redesigned compact variant, was developed per a request for a variant that suited close-quarters combat in South America. In 1977, the original straight magazines were replaced by curved steel magazines. In 1978, the "Tropical" handguard was introduced for the MP5.

In 1980, the MP5 achieved an iconic status during the Iranian Embassy siege, when British Army Special Air Service operatives used MP5s with top-mounted flashlights to assault the embassy and rescue the hostages held inside. Photos of the operation featuring MP5s were widely disseminated in the press and popular media, and drove other military and police units to purchase MP5s as well, quickly making the MP5 widely recognizable and associated with elite counterterrorist units. During the Salvadorian Civil War US Special Forces advisors would arm themselves with H&K MP5 submachineguns for self defense. The MP5 has since become a mainstay in militaries, Special Operations Forces and police tactical units across the world, but has gradually been replaced since the late 1990s by rifles, carbines and personal defense weapons due to changes in armament trends, including growing access to body armor that can stop handgun projectiles.

The MP5 is manufactured under license in several nations including Greece (formerly Hellenic Arms Industry, currently Hellenic Defence Systems), Egypt, Iran (Defense Industries Organization), Mexico (SEDENA), Pakistan (Pakistan Ordnance Factories), Saudi Arabia, Sudan (Military Industry Corporation), Turkey (MKEK) and the United Kingdom (formerly Royal Ordnance, later moved to Heckler & Koch Great Britain).

== Design ==
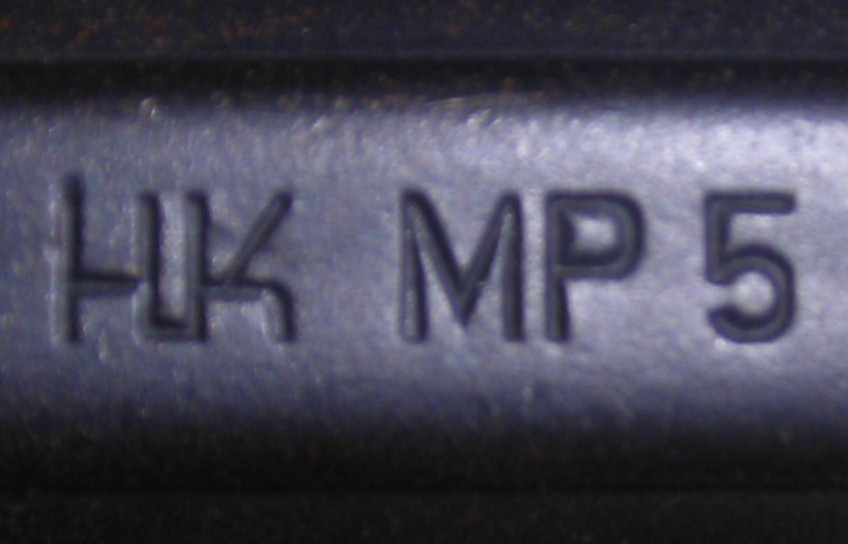
HK MP5 markings on the firearm

The primary version of the MP5 family is the MP5A2, which is a selective fire delayed blowback-operated 9×19mm Parabellum weapon. It fires from a closed bolt (bolt forward) position.

The fixed, free-floating, cold hammer forged barrel has six right hand grooves with a 1 in 250 mm (1:10 in) rifling twist rate and is pressed and pinned into the receiver.

=== Features ===
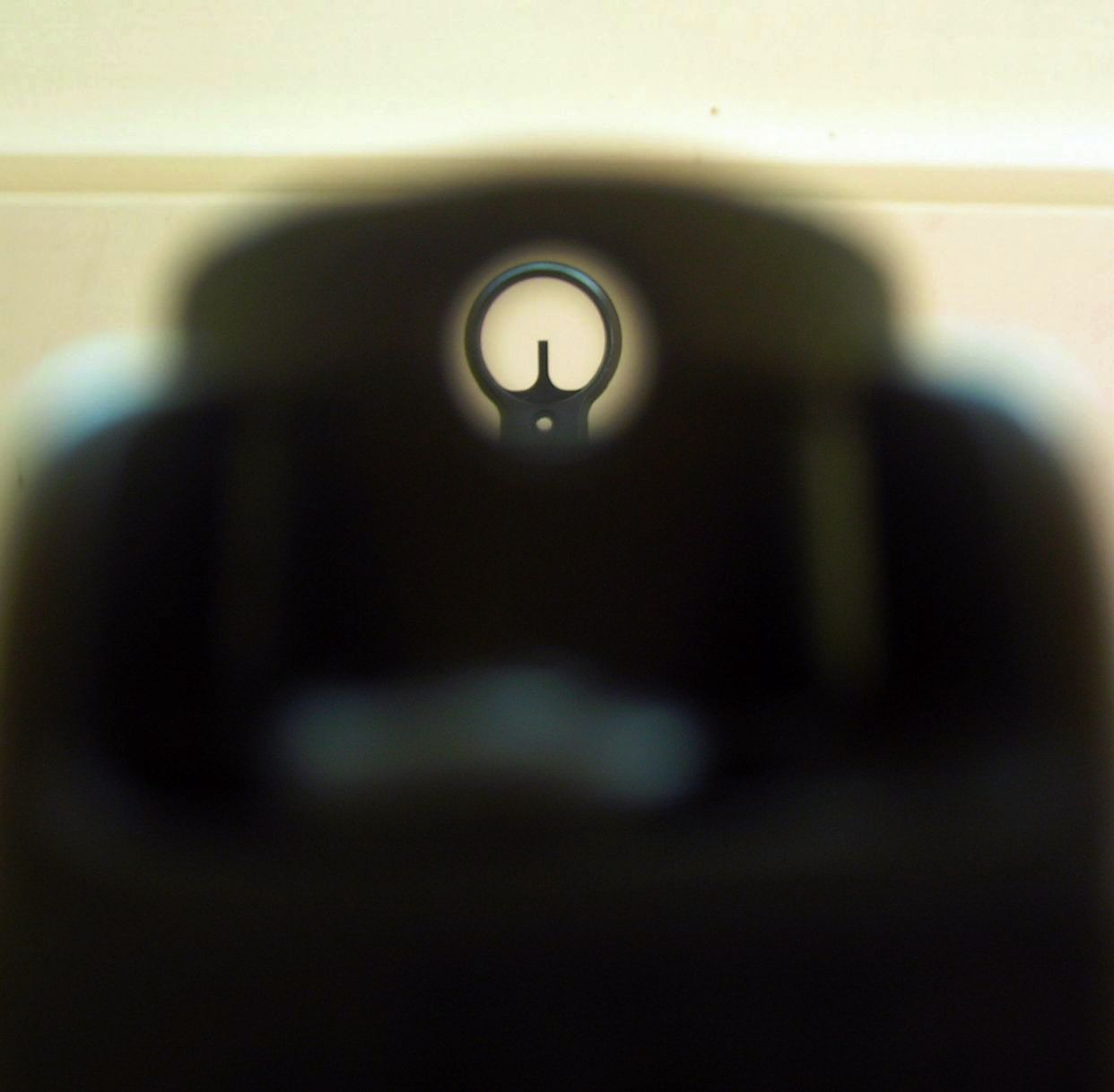
A view through the MP5's iron sights

The first MP5 models used a double column straight box magazine, but since 1977, slightly curved steel magazines have been used with a 15-round capacity (weighing 0.12 kg) or a 30-round capacity (0.17 kg empty).

The adjustable iron sights (closed type) consist of a rotating rear diopter drum and a front post installed in a hooded ring. The rear sight is mechanically adjustable for both windage and elevation with the use of a special tool, being adjusted at the factory for firing at 25 metres (27 yd) with standard 8 grams (123 gr) FMJ 9×19mm NATO ammunition. The rear sight drum provides four apertures of varying diameters used to adjust the diopter system, according to the user's preference and tactical situation. Changing between apertures does not change the point of impact down range.

The MP5 has a hammer firing mechanism. The trigger group is housed inside an interchangeable polymer trigger module (with an integrated pistol grip) and equipped with a three-position fire mode selector that serves as the manual safety toggle. Per HK trigger group standards, most MP5 variants have the option of "SEF" or "Navy" trigger groups, with further alterations based on the availability and type of burst fire; the "SE" and "0-1" trigger groups are only available for semi-automatic and civilian variants. While the "SEF" trigger group's fire selector lever is located on the left-hand side of the trigger, the SEF symbols themselves appear on both sides of the trigger grouping; the "Navy" trigger group, among others, are ambidextrous. The safety/selector is rotated into the various firing settings or safety position by depressing the tail end of the lever. Tactile clicks (stops) are present at each position to provide a positive stop and prevent inadvertent rotation. The "safe" setting disables the trigger by blocking the hammer release with a solid section of the safety axle located inside the trigger housing.

The non-reciprocating cocking handle is located above the handguard and protrudes from the cocking handle tube at approximately a 45° angle. This rigid control is attached to a tubular piece within the cocking lever housing called the cocking lever support, which in turn makes contact with the forward extension of the bolt group. It is not however connected to the bolt carrier and therefore cannot be used as a forward assist to fully seat the bolt group. The cocking handle is held in a forward position by a spring detent located in the front end of the cocking lever support which engages in the cocking lever housing. The lever is locked back by pulling it fully to the rear and rotating it slightly clockwise where it can be hooked into an indent in the cocking lever tube.

=== Operating mechanism ===
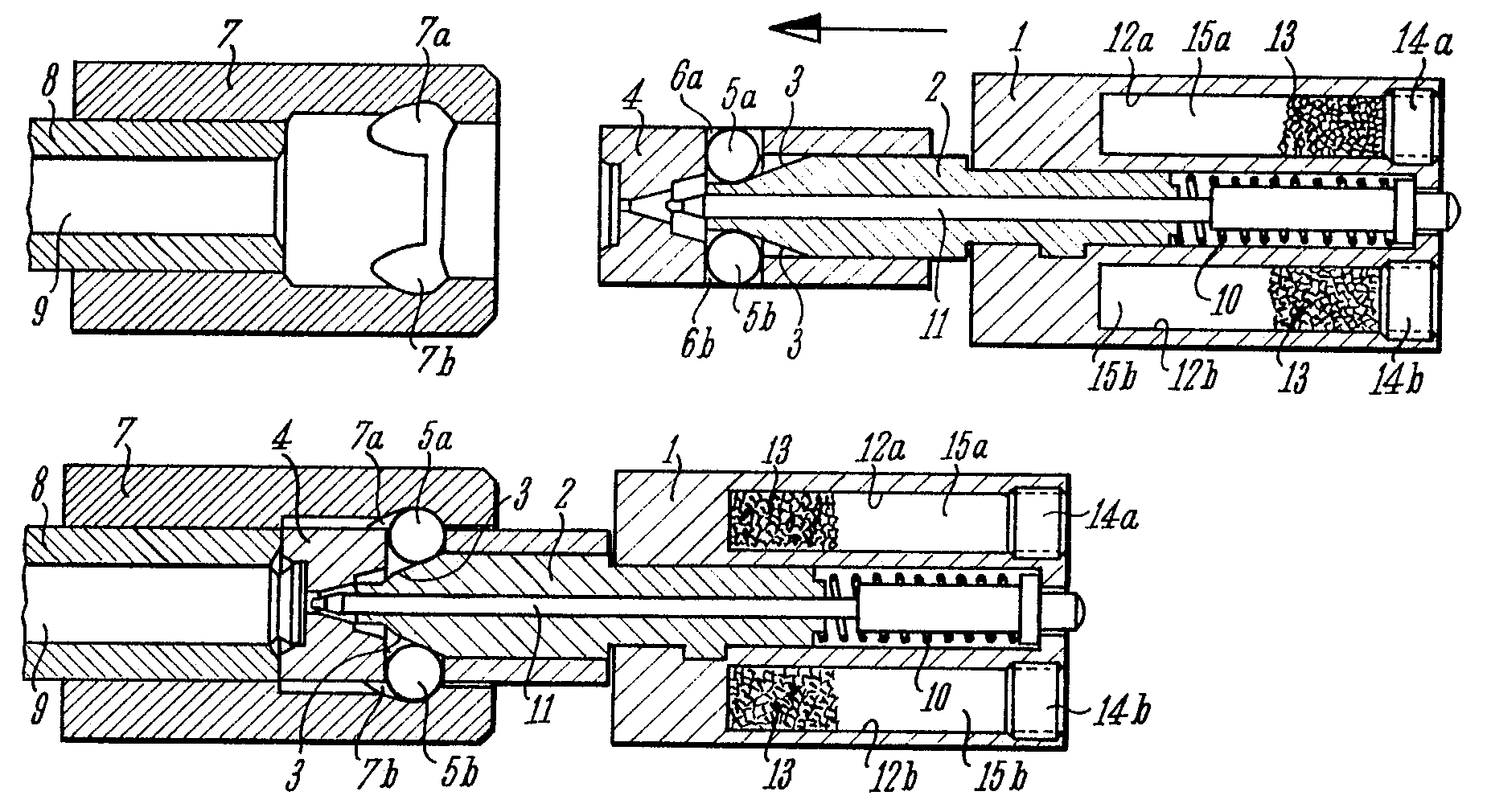
The roller-delayed blowback mechanism, seen here in a 1966 U.S. patent, originated from the aborted StG 45(M) assault rifle prototypes developed in Nazi Germany at the end of World War II.

The bolt rigidly engages the barrel extension—a cylindrical component welded to the receiver into which the barrel is pinned. The delay mechanism is of the same design as that used in the G3 rifle. The two-part bolt consists of a bolt head with rollers and a bolt carrier. The heavier bolt carrier lies up against the bolt head when the weapon is ready to fire and inclined planes on the front locking piece lie between the rollers and force them out into recesses in the barrel extension.

When fired, expanding propellant gases produced from the burning powder in the cartridge exert rearward pressure on the bolt head transferred through the base of the cartridge case as it is propelled out of the chamber. A portion of this force is transmitted through the rollers projecting from the bolt head, which are cammed inward against the inclined flanks of the locking recesses in the barrel extension and to the angled shoulders of the locking piece. The selected angles of the recesses and the incline on the locking piece produce a velocity ratio of about 4:1 between the bolt carrier and the bolt head. This results in a calculated delay, allowing the projectile to exit the barrel and gas pressure to drop to a safe level before the case is extracted from the chamber.

The delay results from the amount of time it takes for enough recoil energy to be transferred through to the bolt carrier in a sufficient quantity for it to be driven to the rear against the force of inertia of the bolt carrier and the forward pressure exerted against the bolt by the recoil spring. As the rollers are forced inward they displace the locking piece and propel the bolt carrier to the rear. The bolt carrier's rearward velocity is four times that of the bolt head since the cartridge remains in the chamber for a short period of time during the initial recoil impulse. After the bolt carrier has travelled rearward 4 mm, the locking piece is withdrawn fully from the bolt head and the rollers are compressed into the bolt head. Only once the locking rollers are fully cammed into the bolt head can the entire bolt group continue its rearward movement in the receiver, breaking the seal in the chamber and continuing the feeding cycle.

Since the 9×19mm Parabellum cartridge is relatively low powered, the bolt does not have an anti-bounce device like the G3, but instead the bolt carrier contains 32.5 g (1.15 oz) of tungsten granules that prevent the bolt group from bouncing back after impacting the barrel extension. The weapon has a fluted chamber that enhances extraction reliability by bleeding gases backwards into the shallow flutes running along the length of the chamber to prevent the cartridge case from expanding and sticking to the chamber walls (since the bolt is opened under relatively high barrel pressure). A spring extractor is installed inside the bolt head and holds the case securely until it strikes the ejector arm and is thrown out of the ejection port to the right of the receiver. The lever-type ejector is located inside the trigger housing (activated by the movement of the recoiling bolt).

=== Accessories ===
==== Barrel accessories ====
Threading is provided at the muzzle to work with certain muzzle devices made by Heckler & Koch, including a slotted flash suppressor, a blank-firing adapter (marked with a red painted band denoting use with blank ammunition only), a rifle grenade adapter (for use with rifle style grenades with an inside diameter of 22 mm using a special grenade launching cartridge) and cup-type tear gas rifle grenade adapter. An optional "3-Lug" barrel is also available on some variants for mounting a quick-detachable suppressor.

===== MP5SD suppressor =====
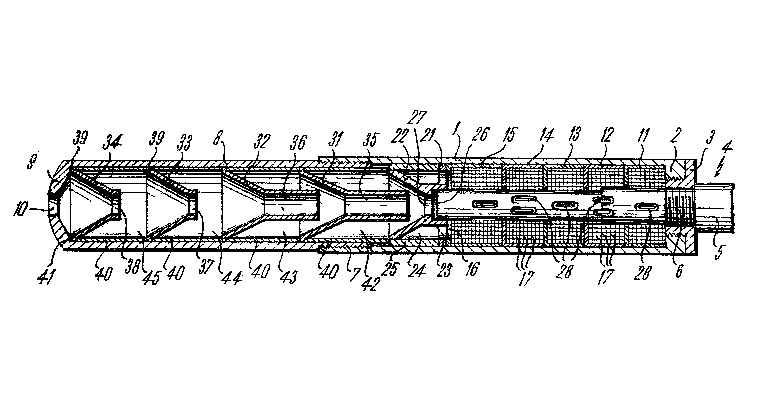
Cross-section diagram of an early MP5SD suppressor from 1971 patent, detailing its vented barrel surrounded by metal mesh packing in the expansion chambers, followed by conical baffles in the forward chambers

The MP5SD's 146 mm (5.7 in) barrel has 30 2.5 mm (0.1 in) ports drilled forward of the chamber through which escaping gases are diverted to the surrounding sealed tubular casing that is screwed onto threading on the barrel's external surface just prior to the ported segment. The MP5SD's integral suppressor itself is divided into two stages: the initial segment surrounding the ported barrel serves as an expansion chamber for the propellant gases, reducing gas pressure to slow down the acceleration of the projectile. The second decompression stage occupies the remaining length of the suppressor tube and contains a stamped metal helix separator with several compartments which increase the gas volume and decrease its temperature, deflecting the gases as they exit the muzzle, so muffling the exit report. The bullet leaves the muzzle at subsonic velocity, so it does not generate a sonic shock wave in flight. As a result of reducing the barrel's length and venting propellant gases into the suppressor, the bullet's muzzle velocity was lowered anywhere from 16% to 26% (depending on the ammunition used) while maintaining the weapon's automation and reliability.

==== Receiver ====
The receiver housing has a proprietary claw-rail mounting system that permits the attachment of a standard Heckler & Koch quick-detachable scope mount (also used with the G3, HK33, and G3SG/1). It can be used to mount daytime optical sights (telescopic 4×24), night sights, reflex sights, and laser sights. The mount features two spring-actuated bolts, positioned along the base of the mount, which exert pressure on the receiver to hold the mount in the same position at all times assuring zero retention. All versions of the quick-detachable scope mount provide a sighting tunnel through the mount so that the shooter can continue to use the fixed iron sights with the scope mount attached to the top of the receiver.

A Picatinny rail adapter can be placed on top that locks into the claw rails. This allows the mounting of STANAG scopes and has a lower profile than the claw-rail system.

==== Handguard ====
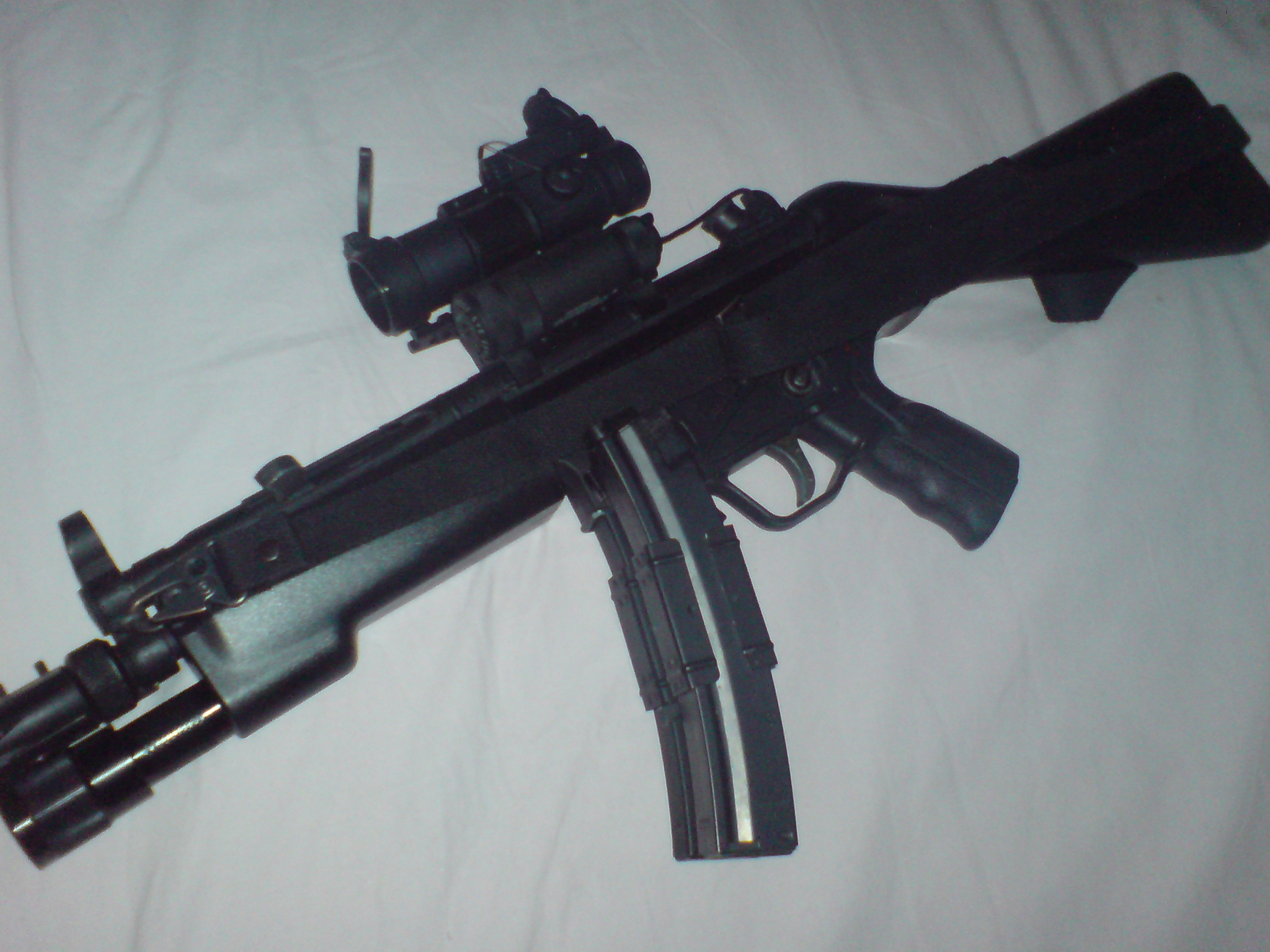
An MP5A2 with an aftermarket "dedicated forend" tactical light-equipped handguard. Also note the fixed stock and jungle style magazines.

Standard MP5 variants have the option of two handguards: "Slimline", the original slim checkered metal handguard; and "Tropical", a wider and smoother polymer handguard introduced in 1978.

The MP5SD, MP5K, and SP89 have unique handguards owing to their design differences: the MP5SD handguard is similar to Slimline but larger to fit the integrated suppressor, the MP5K handguard has a built-in foregrip and handstop and the SP89 handguard is similar to the MP5K's but extended and without the foregrip.

Aftermarket handguards also exist, including newer vented handguards based on the "Tropical" handguard, "dedicated forend" handguards featuring a built-in underbarrel tactical light and rail integration system equipped handguards to fit attachments.

== Variants ==
=== MP5 ===
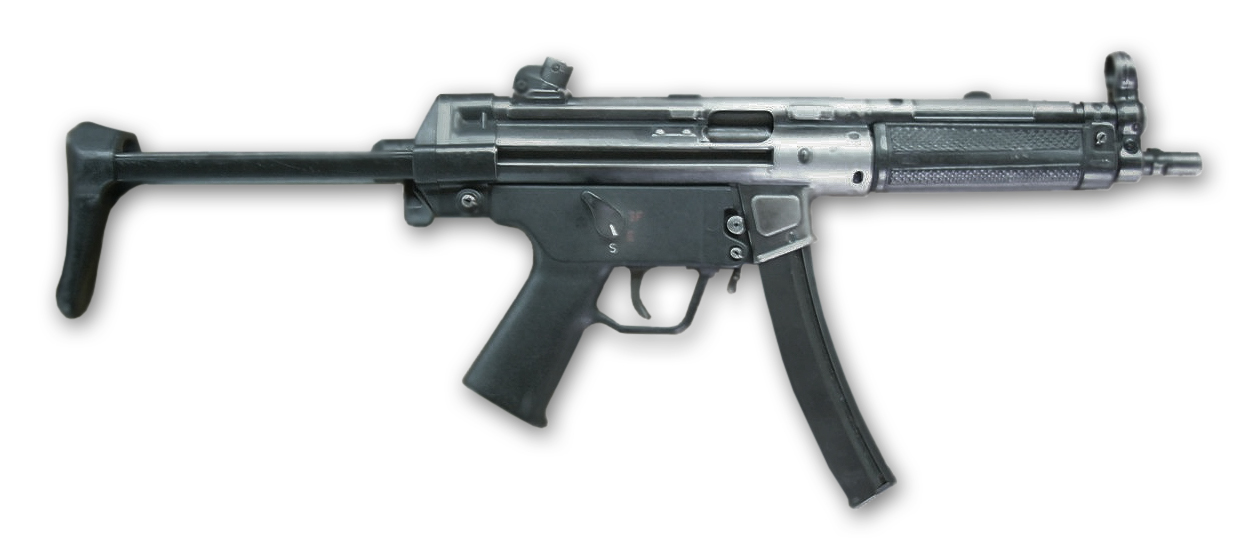
An MP5A3 with the "Ambi" trigger group, a retractable stock, and the "Slimline" handguard

HK54
Original pre-designation model, introduced in 1964. It has a charcoal-gray phosphated finish rather than the matte black lacquered finish used on later models. The handguard resembles the "Slimline" handguard but is narrower and has slots along it. Its bolt carrier is longer and heavier than that of the final MP5, and it uses a flip-up "ladder" rear sight similar to that used on early G3 models. It uses straight steel magazines with plastic followers and distinctive "waffle" rib imprints for reinforcement.
MP5
The basic MP5, based on a modified and improved HK54, introduced in 1966. When first released, it had a gray phosphated finish, "Slimline" handguard, 8.9-inch barrel with "3-Lug" muzzle, and straight waffle magazines. Modernized improvements were introduced in the 1970s: Proprietary "claw mount" rails for scope, laser and flashlight attachments were introduced in 1973, un-ribbed curved magazines with chrome followers were introduced in 1977, the matte black lacquered finish was introduced for export models also in 1977 and the polymer "Tropical" handguard was introduced in 1978.
MP5A1
Standard MP5 with no stock and the "SEF" or "Navy" trigger group.
MP5A2
Standard MP5 with a fixed stock and the "SEF" or "Navy" trigger group.
MP5A3
Standard MP5 with a retractable stock and the "SEF" or "Navy" trigger group.
MP5A4
Standard MP5 with a fixed stock, the "Navy 3-Round Burst" trigger group, and a straight pistol grip.
MP5A5
Standard MP5 with a retractable stock, the "Navy 3-Round Burst" trigger group, and a straight pistol grip.
MP5SF
Semi-automatic variant of the MP5 intended for the law enforcement and military markets, introduced in 1986 to meet a Federal Bureau of Investigation request for a "9mm semi-automatic carbine". Unlike the HK94, the semi-automatic MP5 variant for the civilian market, the MP5SF retains its standard 8.9-inch barrel. It has two variants: the MP5SFA2 with a fixed stock, and the MP5SFA3 with a retractable stock. It uses the "0-1" trigger group, but since 1991, it has been delivered with select-fire bolt carriers that make it capable of automatic fire if paired with an appropriate trigger group.
MP5PT
Training variants of the MP5A4 and MP5A5. They are designed to use a plastic 9×19mm round developed by Dynamit Nobel.
MP5N
Navy variant of the MP5, introduced in 1986 to meet a United States Navy request for a submachine gun effective aboard ships and in low-light conditions. It is essentially an MP5A3 with a standard A3 retractable stock, "Navy Trigger" group (NT) which is a select-fire (fully-automatic) trigger group which excludes burst mode but features ambidextrous selectors, tritium illuminated sights, and additional 1/2 x 32 threading forward of the "3-Lug" muzzle device, intended for mounting a stainless steel suppressor produced by Knight's Armament Company (KAC).
MP5F
Improved French variant of the MP5, introduced in 1999 to meet a French National Gendarmerie request for a suitable standard-issue submachine gun. It is essentially a modified and improved MP5A3, featuring a padded retractable stock, "Navy" trigger group, ambidextrous sling mounts, and internal improvements to handle high-pressure ammunition.
MP5 Mid Life Improvement (MLI)
Modernized refresh of the MP5, introduced in 2015. It is based on the MP5A5 and features the MP5F's padded retractable stock, triple-rail "Slimline" handguard, "Navy 3-Round Burst" trigger group, quick-release sight mount or sight rail, and a RAL 8000 finish. Compatible components of the MP5 MLI can be switched out and retrofitted with other compatible MP5 variants.

=== MP5SD ===
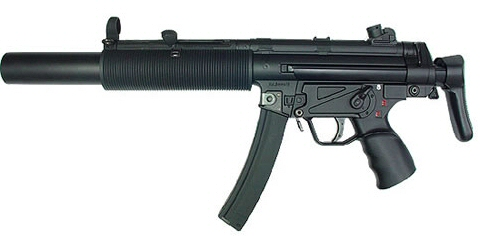
An MP5SD3 with the "SEF" trigger group, a retractable stock, and the MP5SD suppressor and handguard

The MP5SD ("SD" meaning Schalldämpfer, German for "sound suppressor") is a variant of the MP5 with an integral suppressor, introduced in 1974. The integral suppressor, built around its 5.7-inch barrel, uses a unique two-stage design that allows it to operate silently in most environments, including when wet, while still remaining reliable. The distinctive size of the integral suppressor gives it a unique handguard design, with a modified charging handle to account for it. The MP5SD has a rate of fire of approximately 800 rounds per minute, and is intended for use with both standard and subsonic ammunition.

Standard MP5SD with no stock and the "SEF" or "Navy" trigger group.
MP5SD2
Standard MP5SD with a fixed stock and the "SEF" or "Navy" trigger group.
MP5SD3
Standard MP5SD with a retractable stock and the "SEF" or "Navy" trigger group.
MP5SD4
Standard MP5SD with no stock and the "SEF" or "Navy" trigger group. It is largely similar to the MP5SD1.
MP5SD5
Standard MP5SD with a fixed stock and the "Navy 3-Round Burst" trigger group.
MP5SD6
Standard MP5SD with a retractable stock and the "Navy 3-Round Burst" trigger group.
MP5SDN-1
Naval variant of the MP5SD, with a retractable stock, the "Navy 2-Round Burst" trigger group, and the MP5N's KAC stainless steel suppressor.
MP5SDN-2
Naval variant of the MP5SD, with a fixed stock, the "Navy 2-Round Burst" trigger group, and the MP5N's KAC stainless steel suppressor.

=== MP5K ===
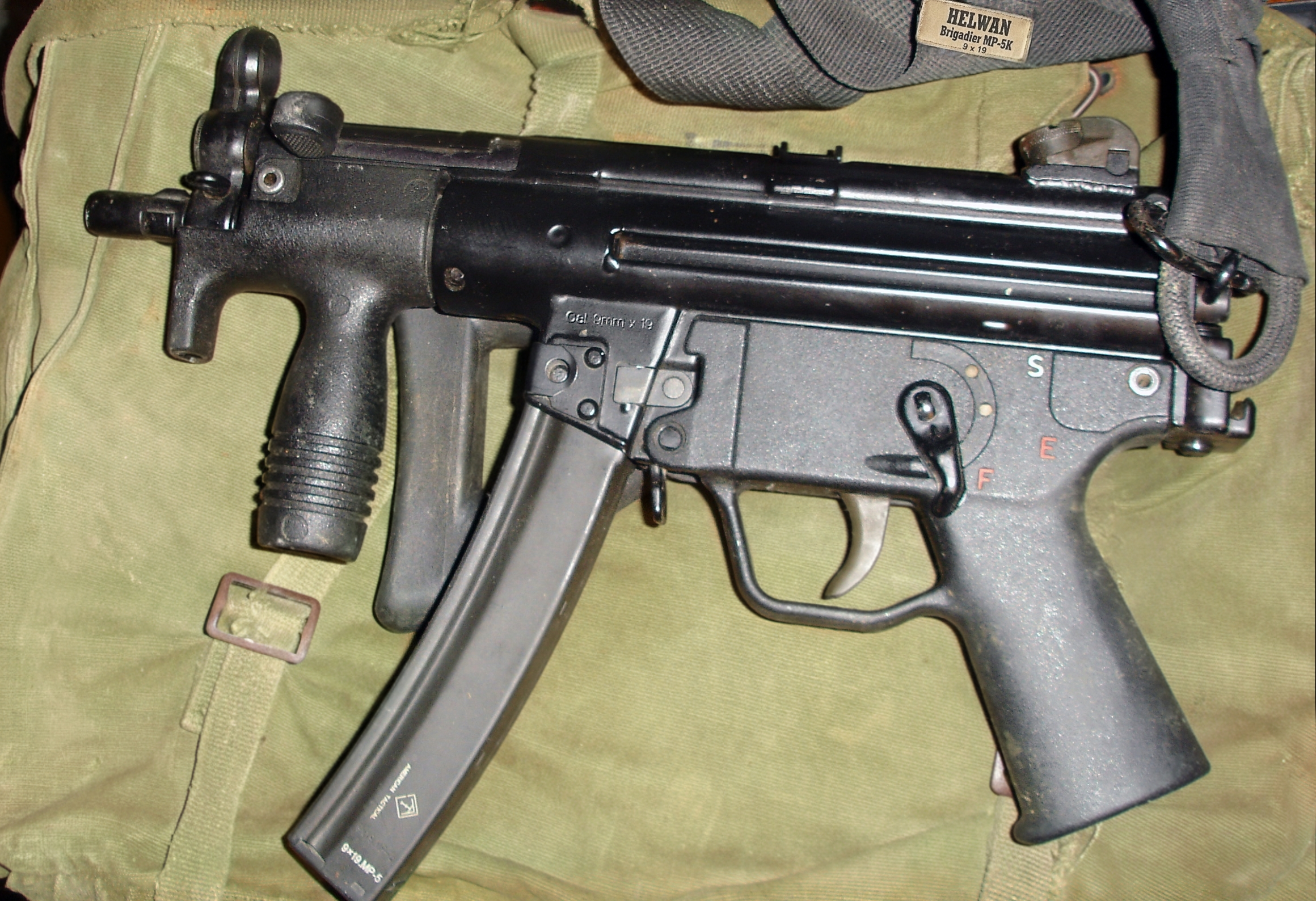
Egyptian HELWAN MP5K, with a long magazine.

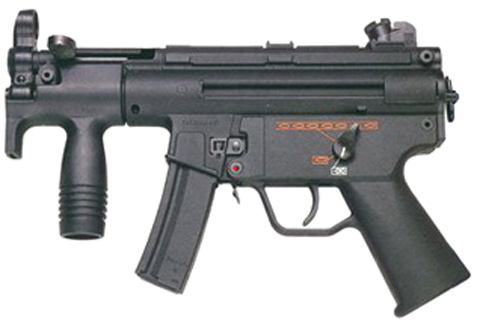
An MP5K with the "Navy" trigger group, no stock, the MP5K foregrip handguard, and normal iron sights

The MP5K ("K" meaning Kurz, German for "short") is a redesigned compact variant of the MP5, introduced in 1976. Developed from the stockless MP5A1, it features a 4.5-inch barrel incompatible with muzzle attachments, an endcap with sling mount instead of a stock, and a unique handguard with a built-in foregrip. Most components of the MP5K are shortened on account of its compact design, including its bolt, receiver, charging handle, cover and trigger group frame. The lighter bolt gives it a higher rate of fire, at approximately 900 rounds per minute (as opposed to 800 rounds per minute with the regular MP5). Different variants of the MP5K use either unique open iron sights or redesigned fixed iron sights.

MP5K Prototype
Stockless, cut-down MP5A2 with regular iron sights and an open vertical foregrip, developed in 1976.
MP5KA1
Standard MP5K with the "SEF" trigger group, smooth upper surface and small low-profile iron sights.
MP5KA4
Standard MP5K with the "Navy 3-Round Burst" trigger group and regular iron sights.
MP5KA5
Standard MP5K with the "Navy 3-Round Burst" trigger group, smooth upper surface and small low-profile iron sights.
MP5K-N
Naval variant of the MP5K, with the "Navy" trigger group and a custom "3-Lug" muzzle similar to that of the MP5N.
MP5K-PDW
"Full-size" variant of the MP5K, introduced in 1991. It is designed to provide the benefits of the MP5K with the size and handling of a regular MP5 and is essentially a regular MP5K with a custom folding stock, "Navy" trigger group, and 5.5-inch barrel with a custom "3-Lug" muzzle similar to that of the MP5N but for a Qual-A-Tec suppressor. Its name is derived from its intended use as a self-defense firearm for vehicle and aircraft crews.
MP5K Operational Briefcase
Standard MP5K intended for use with the Spezialkoffer ("Special Case"), a custom briefcase built by Hofbauer GmbH with a modified claw mount for holding the MP5K, a firing port and a trigger built into the briefcase handgrip, introduced in 1978. Intended for security details in close-range defense or suppressive fire situations, the MP5K Operational Briefcase uses a firing mechanism built into the briefcase to allow the MP5K to fire without taking time to remove it. However, it cannot be reloaded, cleared of obstructions or emptied of spent shell casings without opening the briefcase and detaching the MP5K.
MP5K Special Bag
Variant of the MP5K Operational Briefcase introduced around 1978, using a leather suitcase called the Spezialtasche ("Special Bag"). Instead of using the handgrip as a trigger, the Spezialtasche features a hidden opening that allows the user to discreetly reach into the bag and fire the MP5K directly.
MP5K Falling Case
Variant of the MP5K Operational Briefcase introduced around 1978, using a detachable briefcase called the Zerfallkoffer ("Falling Case"). Instead of allowing the MP5K to fire within the case, the Zerfallkoffer's handgrip and claw mount is designed to be quickly detached from the briefcase, "shedding" it and allowing the MP5K to be used as normal, albeit with a carryhandle. The Zerfallkoffer is also compatible with the MP7.

=== Rechambered variants ===
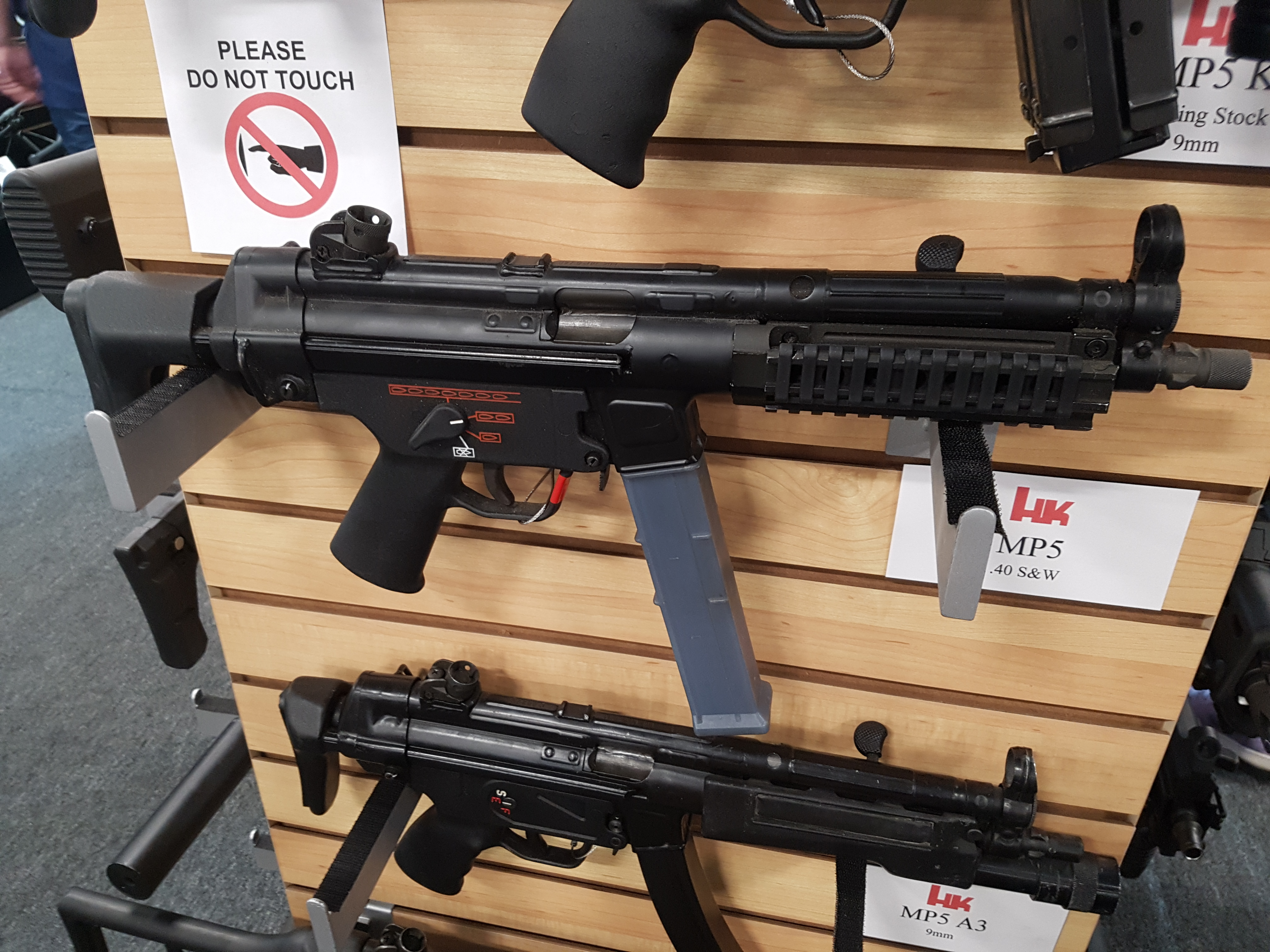
An MP5/40 with a rail-equipped handguard and a polymer 30-round magazine

Though the MP5 is normally chambered in 9×19mm Parabellum, two variants and an unreleased kit existed that used different ammunition.

MP5/10
MP5 chambered in 10mm Auto, introduced in 1992. It features either a fixed or retractable stock, the "Navy 2-Round Burst" trigger group, and the MP5N's custom "3-Lug" muzzle derivative and tritium illuminated sights. It includes a bolt hold-open device, which catches the bolt in its rear position when empty, and is released by pressing a lever on the left side of the receiver. It is fed by custom 30-round translucent straight magazines. The MP5/10 was discontinued in 2000, but HK still offers support and spare parts.
MP5/40
MP5 chambered in .40 S&W, introduced in 1992. It has largely the same features and configuration options of the MP5/10, is fed by similar 30-round translucent straight magazines, but uses the regular "Navy" trigger group (without the burst-fire selection). The MP5/40 was discontinued in 2000, but HK still offers support and spare parts.
MP5 .22 LR
MP5 chambered in .22 Long Rifle, introduced around 2021. It comes in two variants: the MP5 .22 LR Rifle, which resembles an MP5SD3 with a 16.1-inch barrel hidden by a faux "integral suppressor" barrel shroud; and the MP5 .22 LR Pistol, which resembles an MP5A1 or MP5A3 with an 8.5-inch barrel. Both variants use the "Tropical" handguard and the "0-1" trigger group. Like all civilian market MP5 variants, it is semi-automatic only.
MP5 .22 Long Rifle Rechambering Kit
Rechambering kit to convert an MP5 to .22 Long Rifle, introduced in the early 1970s and discontinued at an indeterminate point. The kit consisted of a barrel insert, a bolt group, two 20-round magazines and was mostly sold to law enforcement agencies for training purposes by easing trainees inexperienced with the MP5 into learning handling techniques and firing practice without the high recoil and cost of 9×19mm rounds. The conversion reduced the MP5's rate of fire to 650 rounds per minute. It was ultimately replaced by the MP5 .22 LR in 2021.
MP5 6.5×25mm Rechambering Kit
Rechambering kit to convert an MP5 to 6.5×25mm CBJ, which was proposed in the 2000s but never released. It would have allowed an MP5 to be rechambered simply by switching its barrel.

=== Civilian variants ===
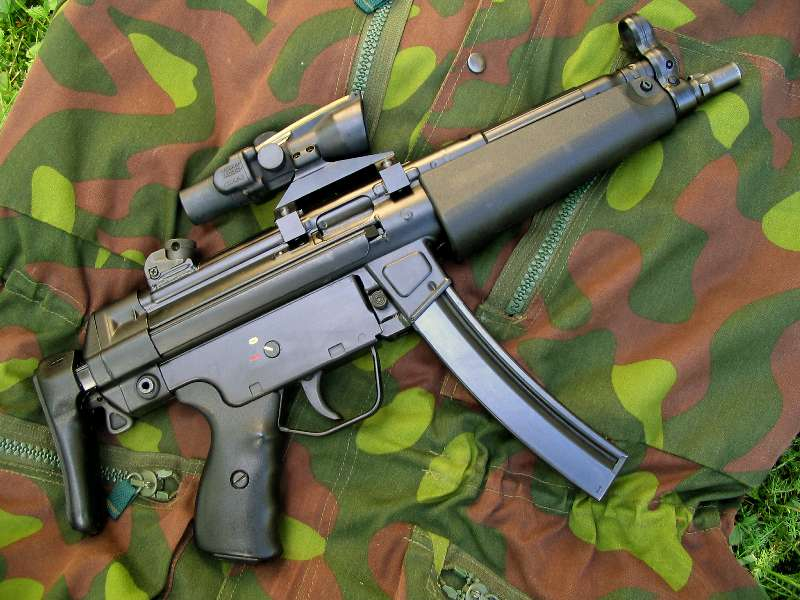
An HK94 with a shortened barrel, the "0-1" trigger group, a retractable stock, the "Tropical" handguard, and an aftermarket ACOG sight

HK94
Civilian market variant of the MP5, imported to the United States civilian market from 1983 to 1989 (with a one-off final order for the California Department of Corrections and Rehabilitation delivered in 1991). It has a 16.54-inch barrel, "0-1" trigger group, push-button magazine release (as opposed to the paddle magazine release on regular MP5s), and a straight pistol grip similar to that on the MP5A4 and MP5A5. It has two variants: the HK94A2 with a fixed stock, and the HK94A3 with a retractable stock. Optional accessories included a handguard-mounted foregrip and a ventilated barrel shroud. The HK94 was particularly popular as a prop in film and television productions of the era, and blank-firing HK94s with "chopped" 8.9-inch barrels and fake automatic conversions were often used as cost effective MP5 stand-ins well into the 2010s.
HK94/SG-1
Accurized sharpshooting variant of the HK94, introduced in 1985. It was designed and intended for marksman fire in situations and environments where precise handgun cartridge fire may be needed, such as dense urban areas and indoor environments like prisons. It has a fixed match stock with a rubber buttpad and an adjustable cheekpiece, a folding bipod, a flash hider and a Leupold 6x telescopic sight. A PSG1-inspired aftermarket trigger pack was also produced, featuring a target pistol grip and match trigger. The HK94/SG-1 did not sell very well due to its niche role and poor performance—it had poor range, penetration, stopping power and its Leupold scope was calibrated for .223 Remington; not 9×19mm. Only 50 units were imported to the U.S., primarily to target shooters and firearm collectors.
SP89
Civilian market variant of the MP5K, imported to the U.S. between 1989 and 1994. To comply with the National Firearms Act, the SP89 features a redesigned handguard that replaces the MP5K's built-in foregrip with an extended barrel shroud. Like all civilian market MP5 variants, it is semi-automatic only.
SP5K
Modernized SP89 for the American civilian market, imported to the U.S. as a pistol in 2017. It largely resembles the SP89, with a redesigned extended barrel shroud and a top-mounted Picatinny rail for sights. Like all civilian market MP5 variants; it is semi-automatic only.
SP5
Modernized civilian market variant of the MP5 introduced in 2019, replacing the HK94. It resembles an MP5A2 with an 8.8-inch barrel, MP5K-style threaded adaptor, "Tropical" handguard, "0-1" trigger group, paddle magazine release, fluted chamber and the buyer's choice of fixed stock, retractable stock or endcap.
SP5K-PDW
Modernized civilian market variant of the MP5K introduced in 2019, replacing the SP5K. It resembles an MP5K without its handguard foregrip. Like all civilian market MP5 variants; it is semi-automatic only.

=== Prototypes ===
Five prototype firearms based on the MP5 were developed by Heckler & Koch in the 1980s and 1990s, mostly intended as improved variants or potential successors but were not developed any further.

HK54A1
Prototype improvement of the HK54, designed for the U.S. Navy Naval Weapons Support Center Crane's (NWSC) Joint Service Small Arms Program (JSSAP) in 1980. It was essentially a refreshed ambidextrous MP5SD with a redesigned retractable stock and compatibility with a 50-round drum magazine. It was designed to be suitable for frogmen and paratroopers in any environment. It was thus also designed to be reliably functional in extreme temperatures and while wearing bulky gloves. HK's proposal for the HK54A1 noted it could be converted to .45 ACP if necessary. An unknown number were produced for testing purposes out of regular MP5 components. The HK54A1 was never properly developed for field use, but it met most JSSAP requirements, drawing the attention of the U.S. government and leading to the development of the SMG I and SMG II.
SMG I
Prototype derived from the HK54A1, first developed for the JSSAP between 1982 and 1983. It was intended to spawn a "family" of modular all purpose submachine guns. Unique for HK, the SMG I used a simple blowback operation with separate lower and upper receivers and an easy-to-remove 5.8-inch barrel with an integral suppressor. It had a boxy body with a retractable stock and a diagonal foregrip. A mechanical and hydraulic buffer in the backplate and a timing device in the stock reduced its rate of fire to a manageable 500 rounds per minute, roughly half that of the HK54A1. The rear iron sight, resembling that of the HK21E, allowed for adjustments based on wind, ammunition type, sight elevation and also featured indents to assist with close-range point shooting. The trigger included an add-on to be used with bulkier cold weather gloves. Only 20 handmade examples were produced. The SMG I was tested by NWSC Crane in 1984 and proved promising but several minor issues prompted the development of the SMG II.
SMG II
Prototype derived from the SMG I, developed around 1985. It has a largely identical design but addresses the issues reported by NWSC Crane. Its combination of the MP5, MP5SD and MP5K was made more clear. Analogous to the MP5 by default, the addition of a custom suppressor made it akin to the MP5SD. The removal of the suppressor and retractable stock converted it into an MP5K-like automatic pistol. The three-round burst fire setting returned from the HK54A1. Several components were made from plastic to reduce weight, while the over-engineered rear sight was abandoned for a simpler MP5 style sight. Uniquely, the SMG II had a gas cylinder in the handguard with a gas relief valve on the receiver, used to control round velocity and thus also sound. The "L" setting reduced the propellant gases to fire rounds below the speed of sound and thus without the usual crack of supersonic projectiles for almost silent suppressed fire, while the "H" setting used all available gas to fire rounds at full velocity for reliable unsuppressed fire. Other internal changes were made to reduce cost, simplify production and maintenance, but otherwise the SMG II was largely just an improvement of the SMG I. Like the SMG I, only 20 handmade examples were produced for testing by NWSC Crane. While the SMG II again proved promising, it was ultimately abandoned, not for budgetary or technical concerns, but simply due to the success of the regular MP5 and its derivatives, which were already popular enough with the U.S. Navy and all other potential customers to make a replacement unnecessary; HK ultimately developed the MP5N for the U.S. Navy instead. Allegedly, between 60 and 80 additional SMG IIs were secretly commissioned for an unidentified U.S. government agency, possibly a member of the U.S. Intelligence Community, where they were favored by their users, but the lack of spare parts and the gradual move to higher caliber firearms for close-quarters combat led to all of them being retired and melted down for disposal some time around 1999. Technical knowledge from the SMG II and the concept of a universal submachine gun were later repurposed for the MP2000 prototype and the UMP.
MP5 PIP
Prototype developed around the late 1980s and early 1990s. Very little is known about the MP5 PIP or why it was developed, but it had a boxier body resembling the later UMP, a shorter diagonal magazine and the "flipper" charging handle later used on the G36. Only one non-functional wooden mockup was produced.
MP2000
Prototype derived from the SMG II, developed in the 1990s. It somewhat resembled the SMG II and featured a propellant gas-based round velocity silencing system similar to that of the SMG II. It was presumably an attempted revival of the SMG II concept to replace the MP5 for the 21st century. It is an immediate predecessor of the UMP, which was ultimately marketed as such.

== Other manufacturers ==
=== Under license ===
Name	Origin	Manufacturer	Photo	Notes
MP5K	Egypt	HELWAN		
EMP5	Greece	Hellenic Defence Systems		Originally produced by Hellenic Arms Industry (EBO) as the EBO 9 mm EMP5
Tondar	Iran	Defense Industries Organization		MP5A3 copy
Tondar Light	Iran	Defense Industries Organization		MP5K copy
	Mexico	SEDENA		
MP5P	Pakistan	Pakistan Ordnance Factories		
POF4	Pakistan	Pakistan Ordnance Factories		
POF-5	Pakistan	Pakistan Ordnance Factories		
MP5	Saudi Arabia	Military Industries Corporation		
BT-96	Switzerland	Brügger & Thomet		
MP5A3	Turkey	MKE (formerly MKEK)		With different trigger groups: E (Safe), T (Semi-Auto) and S (Full Auto).
Enfield MP5	United Kingdom	Royal Small Arms Factory		

=== Manufactured without license ===
Name	Origin	Manufacturer	Notes
NR-08	China	Norinco	MP5A4 copy
NR-08A	China	Norinco	MP5A4 copy
CS/LS3	China	Norinco	MP5A5 copy, mainly for exports
OFB Anamika 9mm	India	Indian Ordnance Factory	MP5A3 copy
Tihraga	Sudan	Military Industry Corporation	MP5A3 and DIO Tondar copy.

In the United States, PTR Industries, Zenith Firearms, Dakota Tactical, and Century International Arms manufacture semi-automatic clones of the MP5 that are legally classified as pistols. In 2007, Professional Arms demonstrated the MK5, an MP5 clone that could be rechambered between 9×19mm, .45 ACP, and .40 S&W.

== Users ==
Worldwide users of the MP5 (former and current)

Country/Region	Organization name	Model	Caliber	Reference
Afghanistan	Afghan National Army	Pakistani-made (after 2001) West German	_	
Afghanistan	Zahir Qadir's Frontier Force	Pakistani-made (after 2001) West German	_	
Albania	Garda e Republikës	_	_	
Albania	Batalioni i Operacioneve Speciale (BOS)	K	_	
Algeria	Algerian Police	SD6, SD3, K, A3, A5	9mm	
Algeria	Algerian Special Forces	_	9mm	
Argentina	Argentine Navy	_	_	
Argentina	Argentine National Gendarmerie	_	_	
Argentina	Argentine Federal Police	_	_	
Argentina	Argentine Naval Prefecture	A2	_	
Australia	Airfield Defence Guards of the Royal Australian Air Force	A3	9mm	
Australia	Special Operations Command	A3, K, SD	9mm	
Australia	Police Tactical Groups	_	9mm	
Azerbaijan	Underwater Offence (SÖH)	SD6 (MKEK)	9mm	
Bahrain	_	_	_	
Bangladesh	Bangladesh Army	_	_	
Bangladesh	Bangladesh SWAT Police	_	_	
Bangladesh	Rapid Action Battalion,	_	_	
Bangladesh	Special Warfare Diving And Salvage of the Bangladesh Navy	_	_	
Belarus	"Almaz" anti-terrorist group	A3, K	9mm	
Belarus	KGB Alpha Group	A3	9mm	
Belgium	Law enforcement in Belgium	_	9mm	
Bosnia and Herzegovina	Special Anti-Terrorist Unit (Republika Srpska)	A5, SD3	9mm	
Brazil	Federal Police	A2, A3, A5, SD3	9mm	
Brazil	BOPE	A5, K	9mm	
Brazil	1º Batalhão de Forças Especiais	KA4, SD1, SD6	9mm	
Brazil	Brasilia Police	A3	9mm	
Brazil	Civil Police of Rio de Janeiro State	_	_	
Brazil	Comando de Operações Taticas	A5, SD6	9mm	
Brazil	COMANF	KA4, SD6	9mm	
Brunei	Royal Brunei Police Force	_	9mm	
Bulgaria	Specialized Anti-Terrorism Task Force	SD3	9mm	
Cameroon	_	_	_	
Canada	Royal Canadian Mounted Police	A2, A3	_	
Canada	Royal Canadian Navy	A2, A3	_	
Canada	Sûreté du Québec	A2, A3	_	
Chile	_	_	_	
China	People's Police	NR-08, CS/LS3	_	
Costa Rica	UEA (Unidad Especial de Apoyo) Special Police Unit	_	_	
Croatia	Lučko Anti-Terrorist Unit	SD3	_	
Cuba	Black Wasp	A3	_	
Cuba	Special Unit of MININT	A3	_	
Cyprus	National Guard: Military Police and MYK	A3 & A5	9mm	
Czech Republic	Police of the Czech Republic	A5, SD6, SA3, K	_	
Czech Republic	Military of Czech Republic	A5, SD6, SA3, K	_	
Democratic Republic of Congo	_	_	_	
Denmark	Frogman Corps	_	_	
Denmark	Danish Police	_	_	
Ecuador	National Police	_	_	
Egypt	Unit 777	K, A3, A5, SD	_	
Egypt	Egyptian Republican Guard	K, A3, A5, SD	_	
Egypt	Egyptian National Police	K, A3, A5, SD	_	
Estonia	Estonian Defence Forces	A2	9mm	
Fiji	-	_	_	
Finland	Special operations forces and military police of the Finnish Defence Forces	A3	9mm	
France	Groupe d'Intervention de la Gendarmerie Nationale (GIGN)	A5, K	_	
France	Certain specialized units within the French Army	A5, SD3, F	9mm	
Georgia	Georgian Special Forces	K, SD, A3, A1	9mm	
Georgia	Special State Protection Service (SSPS)	K, SD, A3, A1	9mm	
Georgia	Coast Guard of Georgia	K, SD, A3, A1	9mm	
Germany	Bundespolizei (Federal Police)	_	_	
Germany	Landespolizei (State Police)	_	_	
Germany	German Army	_	_	
Germany	Feldjäger (Military Police)	_	_	
Germany	GSG 9 police tactical unit	_	_	
Germany	German Navy	_	_	
Germany	SEK			
Ghana	_	_	_	
Honduras	_	_	_	
Hong Kong	Hong Kong Police Force	SFA2、A3、A5、F、K、K-PDW、RAS、SD3、SK、S-N1、S-N2	_	
Hong Kong	Hong Kong Customs and Excise Department	SFA3	_	
Iceland	Icelandic Coast Guard	A2N	9 mm	
Iceland	Víkingasveitin	_	9 mm	
Iceland	Icelandic National Police	_	9 mm	
India	Indian Army	_	_	
India	MARCOS	_	_	
India	National Security Guards	_	_	
India	Force One counter-terrorism group of the Mumbai Police	_	_	
India	Mizoram Police	_	_	_
India	Special Protection Group	_	_	
India	Kolkata Police	_	_	_
Indonesia	Kopassus (Special Forces Command) of the Indonesian Army.	A3, SD2	9mm	
Indonesia	KOPASKA (Frogman Forces Command) of the Indonesian Navy.	A3, SD3	9mm	
Indonesia	Denjaka (Counter-terrorism special operations force) of the Indonesian Navy.	N, A2, K, SD2	9mm	
Indonesia	Korpasgat (Quick Reaction Forces Corps) of the Indonesian Air Force.	K-PDW, SD3	9mm	
Indonesia	Detachment 88 (Counter-terrorism detachment) of the Indonesian National Police.	A2, A3	9mm	
Iraq	Counter Terrorist Service	A3		
Iran	Iranian Army	MPT-9	_	
Ireland	Army Ranger Wing	A3, SD6, F, K	9mm	
Ireland	Directorate of Military Intelligence	_	_	
Ireland	Garda Special Detective Unit	_	_	
Ireland	Garda Emergency Response Unit	_	_	
Italy	Carabinieri	_	_	
Ivory Coast	Unknown users	A5	9mm	
Jamaica	Jamaica Constabulary Force	_	_	
Japan	Special Boarding Unit	A5, SD6	9mm	
Japan	Special Assault Teams	A4, A5; SD4, SD6	_	
Japan	Anti-firearms squads of prefectural police departments	A4, A5; SD4, SD6	_	
Japan	Special Investigation Teams of prefectural police departments	SFK	_	
Japan	Special Security Team of the Japan Coast Guard	_	_	
Japan	Japanese Special Forces Group	SD6	9mm	
Japan	Japanese Imperial Guard	_	_	
Jordan	_	_	_	
Kazakhstan	Special Forces	SD6	9mm	
Kuwait	_	_	_	
Kenya	Kenya Police	_	_	
Latvia	Latvian Land Forces	A3	9mm	
Lebanon	Marine Commandos	A3	_	
Libya		_	_	
Liechtenstein	Special Police Unit	_	_	
Liechtenstein	Security Corps	_	_	
Lithuania	Lithuanian Armed Forces	_	_	
Lithuania	Aras	_	_	
Luxembourg	Unité Spéciale de la Police intervention unit of the Grand Ducal Police	_	_	
Macau	Public Security Police Force			
Macau	Polícia Judiciária			
Macau	Correctional Services Bureau			
Malaysia	Royal Malaysia Police	A2, A3, K, SD2, SD3	9mm	
Malaysia	Royal Malaysian Customs	A2, A3, K, SD2, SD3	9mm	
Malaysia	10 Paratrooper Brigade commando of the Malaysian Army	A3, SD2, SD3	9mm	
Malaysia	National Special Operations Force (NSOF)	_	9mm	
Malaysia	Trup Tindakan Cepat special operations unit of the Malaysian Prison Department	A3, SD3	9mm	
Malta	Armed Forces of Malta	_	_	
Mauritius	_	_	_	
Mexico	Mexican Army	A4	9mm	
Morocco	Royal Moroccan Army	A2	9mm	
Morocco	Royal Moroccan Navy	_	_	
Morocco	Royal Moroccan Gendarmerie	A2	9mm	
Montenegro	Armed Forces of Montenegro	SD6, SD3, SD2, A5, A3, A2, K-PDW	9mm	
Montenegro	Protivteroristička Jedinica Policije (Counter-Terrorist Police Unit) (PTJ)	SD3, A3, A2, K	9mm	
Montenegro	Posebna Jedinica Policije (Special Police Unit) (PJP)	SD3, A3, A2, K	9mm	
Nepal	Nepalese Army	_	_	
Netherlands	Dutch Royal and Diplomatic security (DKDB)	_	_	
Netherlands	Koninklijke Marechaussee	A3	9mm	
Netherlands	Dutch police	_	_	
New Zealand	Special Air Service of the New Zealand Army	_	_	
New Zealand	Special Tactics Group of the New Zealand Police	_	_	
Nicaragua	_	_	_	
Niger	_	_	_	
Nigeria	_	_	_	
Norway	Norwegian Armed Forces, replaced by the MP7	A2N, A3N	9mm	
Norway	Norwegian Police Service	_	_	
Palestine	Palestinian national security forces	_	_	
Pakistan	Pakistan Army	_	_	
Pakistan	Airports Security Force	_	_	
Pakistan	Personal security detail of VIP's	_	_	
Peru	Peruvian Army special forces	SD3	_	
Philippines	Armed Forces of the Philippines	_	_	
Philippines	Philippine National Police	_	_	
Philippines	Philippine Coast Guard	_	_	
Poland	Police of Poland	A3, A5, SD6, KA4	9mm	
Portugal	Special Operations Troops Centre	A5, SD6, KA4	9mm	
Portugal	Portuguese Marine Corps	A5	9mm	
Portugal	National Republican Guard	_	9mm	
Portugal	Polícia de Segurança Pública	_	9mm	
Qatar	_	_	_	
Romania	Romanian Special Operations Forces	N	9mm	
Romania	Romanian Intelligence Service (SRI) Counter Terrorist Brigade (Brigada Antiteroristă)	_	9mm	
Romania	Brigada Specială de Intervenție a Jandarmeriei	_	9mm	
Romania	Detașamentul Special de Protecție și Intervenție	_	9mm	
Russia	FSB Alpha Group	A3	9mm	
Saudi Arabia	Royal Saudi Land Forces	A2, A3	9mm	
Serbia	72nd Reconnaissance-Commando Battalion	SD3	_	
Singapore	Singapore Armed Forces Commando Formation	_	9mm	
Singapore	Singapore Police Force	_	9mm	
Slovakia	Slovak Police	_	_	
Slovenia	Military Police of Slovenian Armed Forces	_	_	
Slovenia	SEP SWAT Special Police Unit of Slovenian Police	_	_	
South Africa	Special Task Force of the South African Police Service	N	9mm	
South Africa	South African Special Forces	SD3		
South Africa	South African Army			
South Africa	Maritime Reaction Squadron			
South Korea	Republic of Korea Naval Special Warfare Brigade	_	_	
Spain	Grupo Especial de Operaciones	_	_	
Spain	Servicio de Vigilancia Aduanera (SVA)	_	_	
Sudan	Sudanese Army	Locally assembled Iranian Tondar.	_	
Sweden	Swedish Police Authority	A5	_	
Switzerland	Swiss Army	A3, A5, K	_	
Taiwan	Republic of China Army	_	_	
Taiwan	Republic of China Marine Corps	_	_	
Taiwan	Coast Guard Administration	_	_	
Taiwan	National Police Agency	_	_	
Thailand	Royal Thai Police	A2, A3	9mm	
Thailand	Department of Corrections	A2, A3	9mm	
Turkey	Turkish Armed Forces	A2, A3, SD3, K	9mm	
Turkey	General Directorate of Security	A2, A3, SD3, K	9mm	
Ukraine	Rapid Operational Response Unit (KORD)	A3 (MKEK)	9mm	
United Arab Emirates	_	_	_	
United Kingdom	United Kingdom Special Forces (UKSF)	A3, SD3, K, KA1	9mm	
United Kingdom	Police Service of Northern Ireland	SF	9mm	
United Kingdom	Metropolitan Police Specialist Firearms Command (SCO-19)	SF	9mm	
United Kingdom	Other British police Authorised Firearms Officers	SF	9mm	
United States	Special Operations Command (SOCOM)	N, K-N, SD-N	9mm	
United States	Secret Service	_	_	
United States	FBI Hostage Rescue Team	MP5/10	10mm	
United States	Law enforcement in the United States	_	_	
Uruguay	Uruguayan Navy Special Forces	A5	9mm	
Vatican City	Swiss Guard	_	_	
Vietnam	Mobile Police Command (CSCĐ) teams	A3, K-A4	9mm	
Vietnam	Quick reaction force (113) police	A3, K-A4	9mm	
Zambia	_	_	_	

=== Non-state users ===
- Hezbollah

=== Former users ===
- East Germany: Used by Diensteinheit IX.
- Republic of Bosnia and Herzegovina: Used by the Army of Bosnia and Herzegovina during the Bosnian War
- Republic of Srpska: Used by the Army of Republika Srpska during the Bosnian War
- Yugoslavia

== Gallery ==
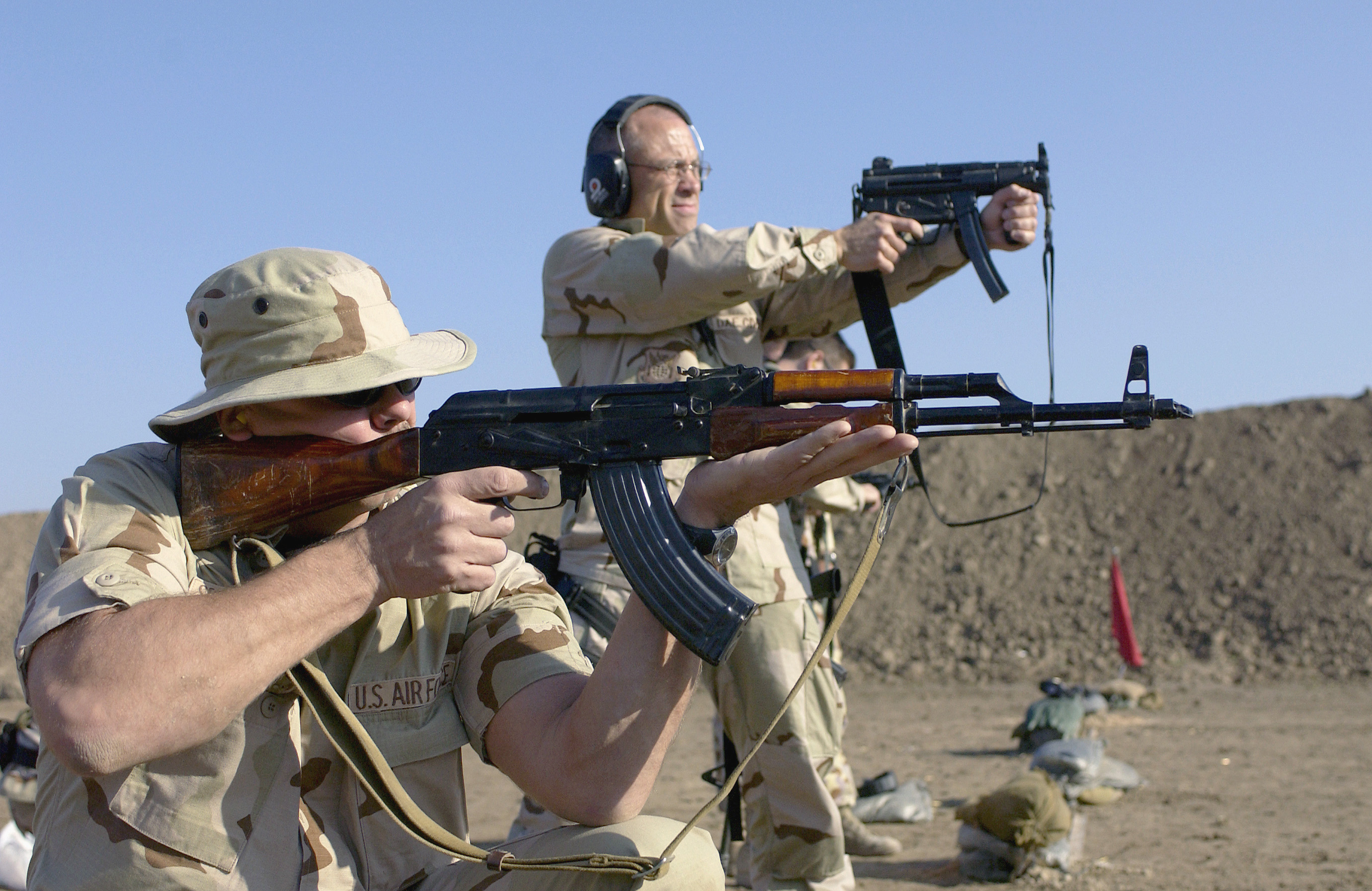
An American Air Traffic Control Detachment range officer fires an MP5K at the Baghdad International Airport firing range.

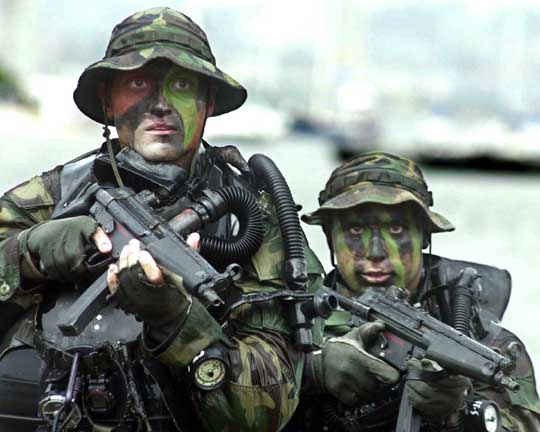
U.S. Navy SEALs armed with MP5-Ns on a training exercise.

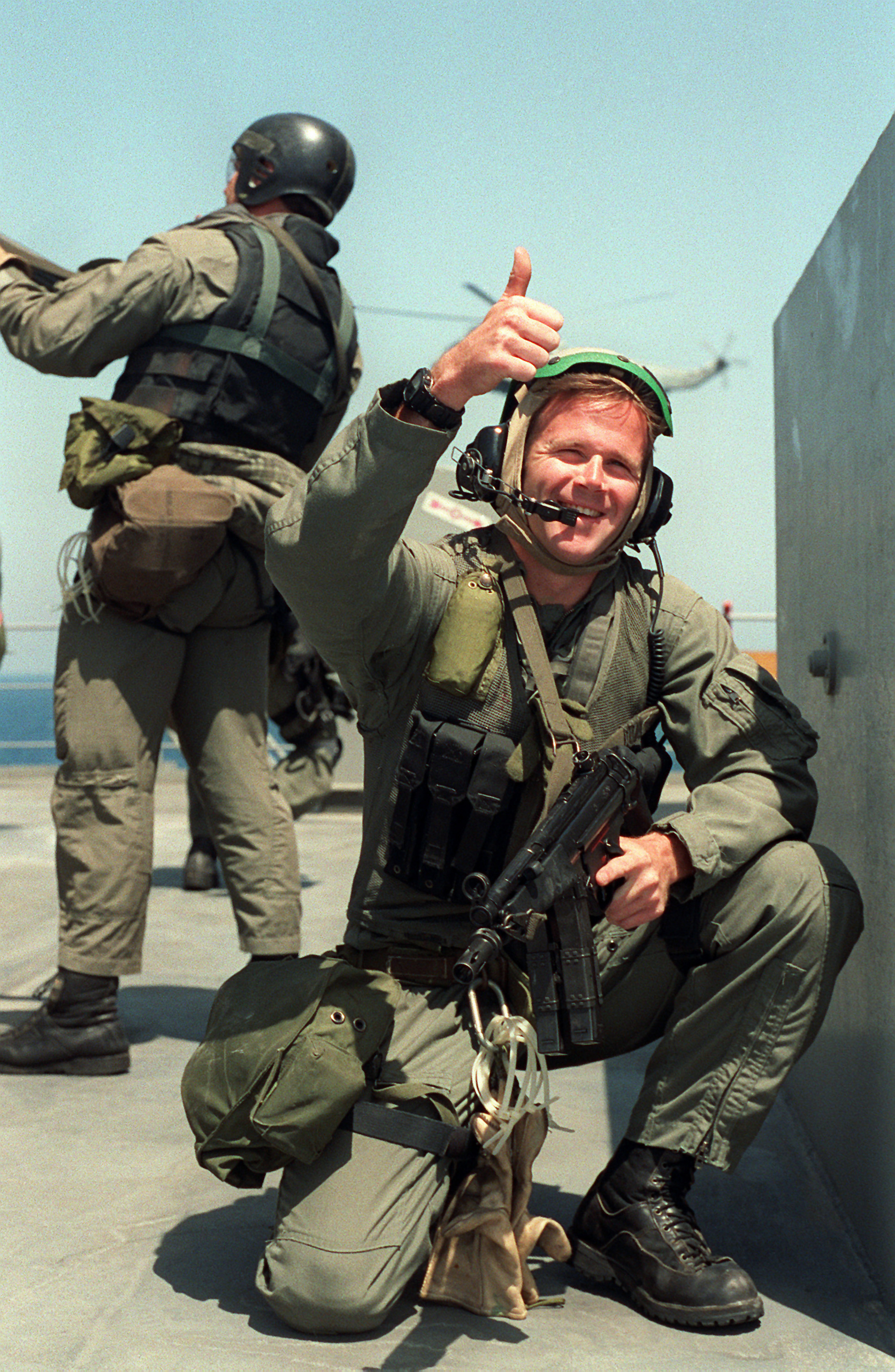
A member of SEAL Team 8 with an MP5-N variant in February 1991.

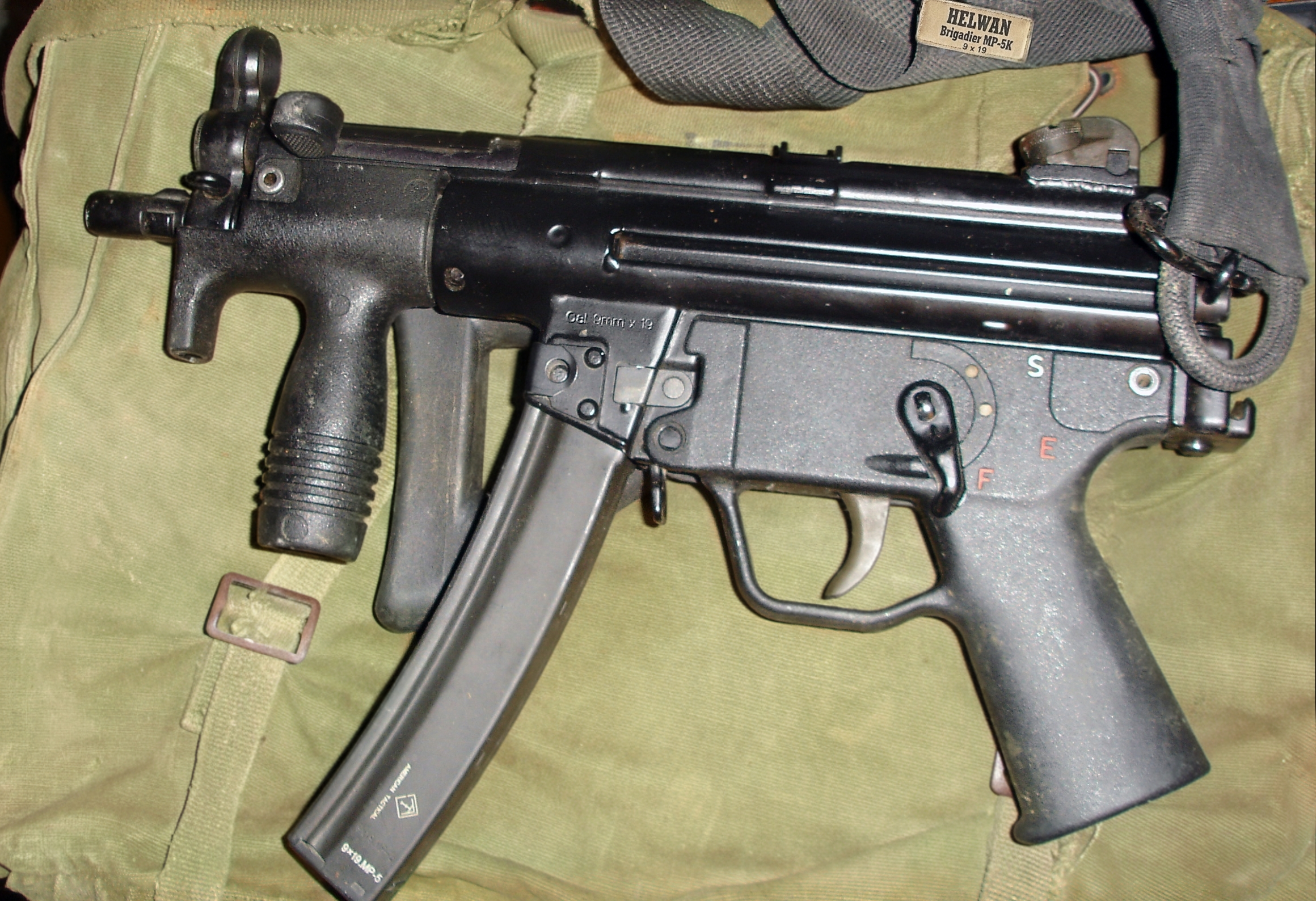
The Helwan MP5K is used by Group 55 (the international counter-terrorism unit) of the 6th Battalion of the Egyptian Republican Guard.

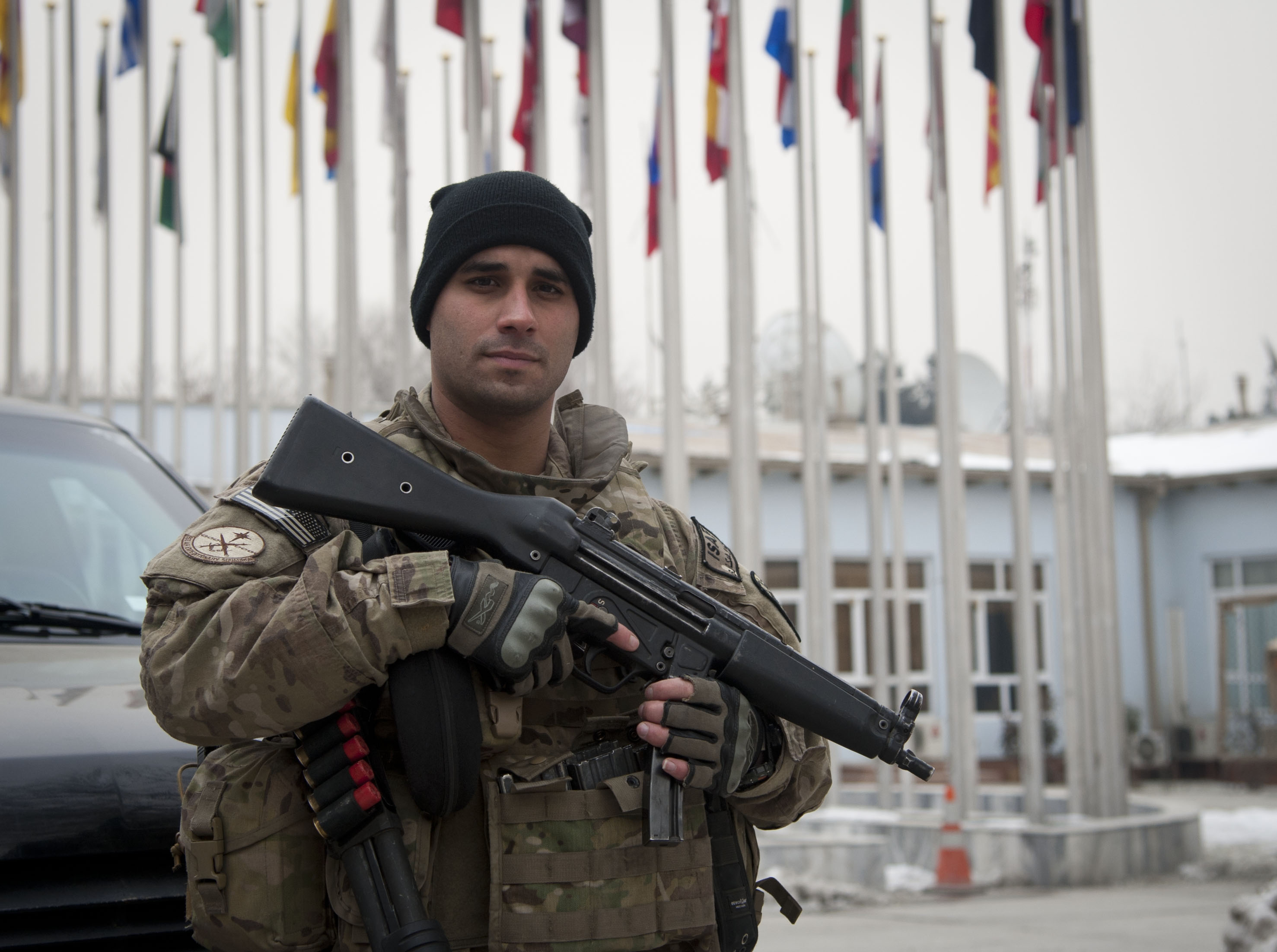
U.S. Air Force 466th Air Expeditionary Group officer with MP5A2 in Afghanistan.

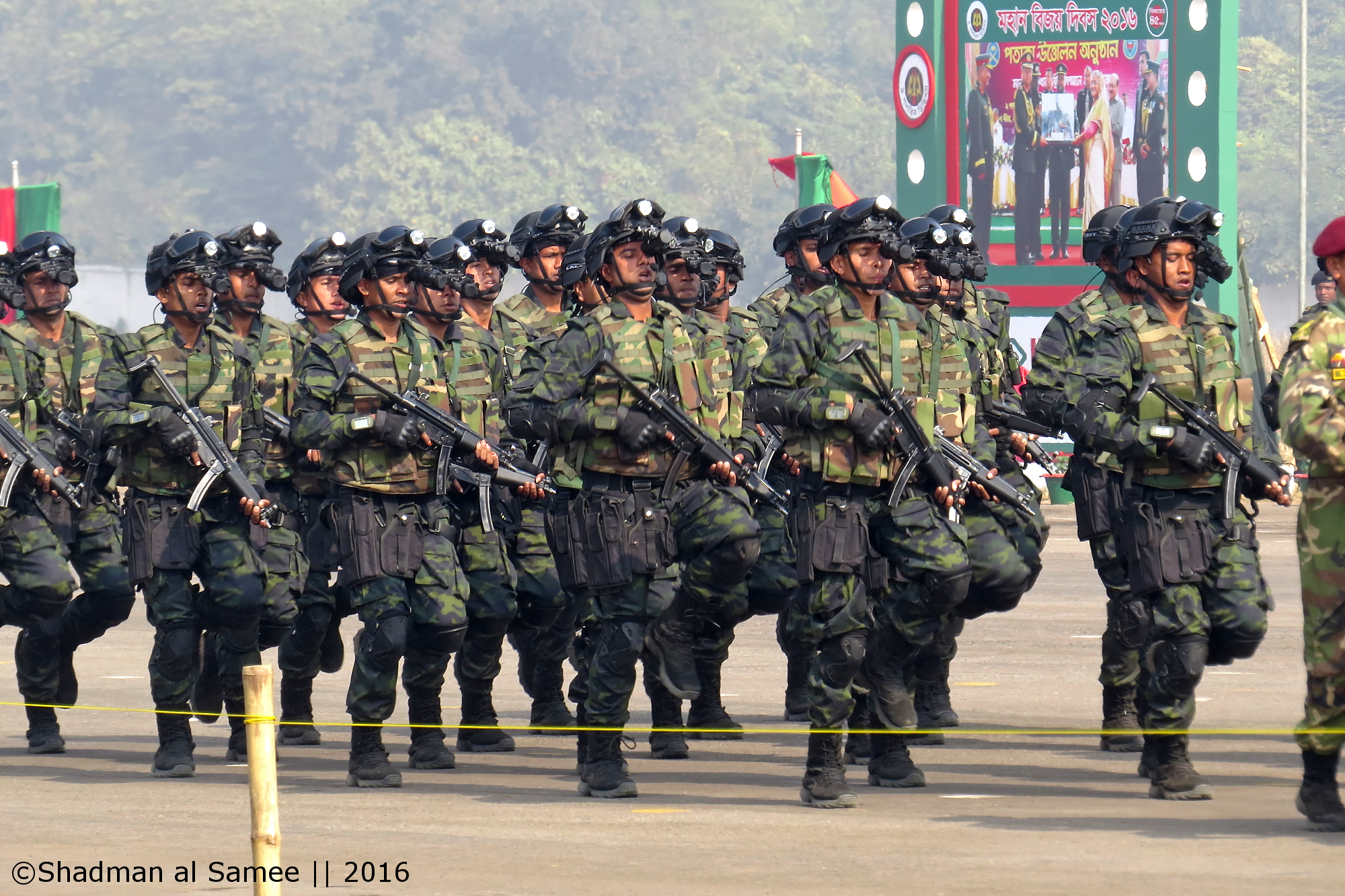
Bangladesh Army Counter Terrorism unit with MP5A3s in Victory Day Parade 2016.

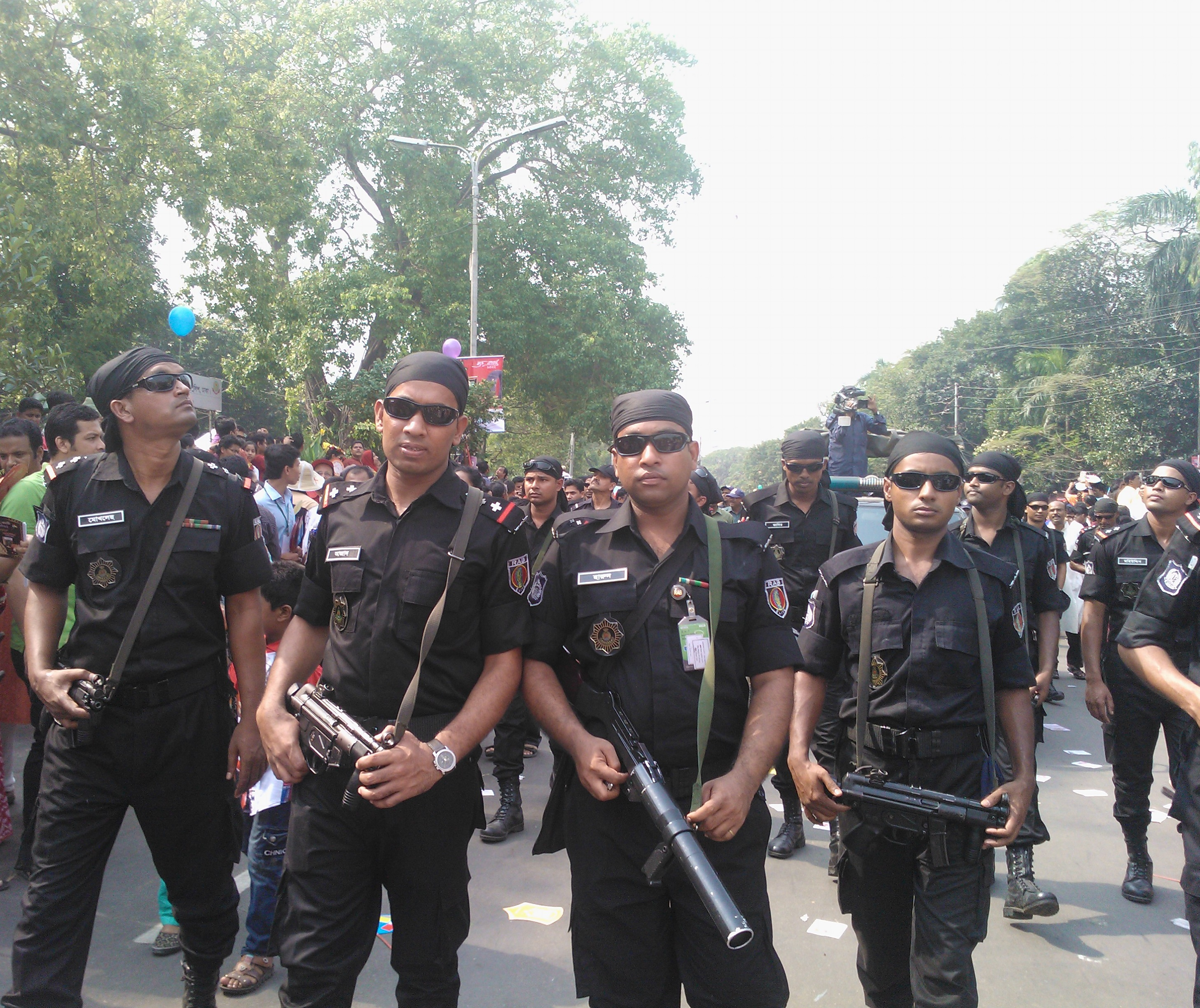
Rapid Action Battalion of Bangladesh armed with MP5Ks (except the second from right).

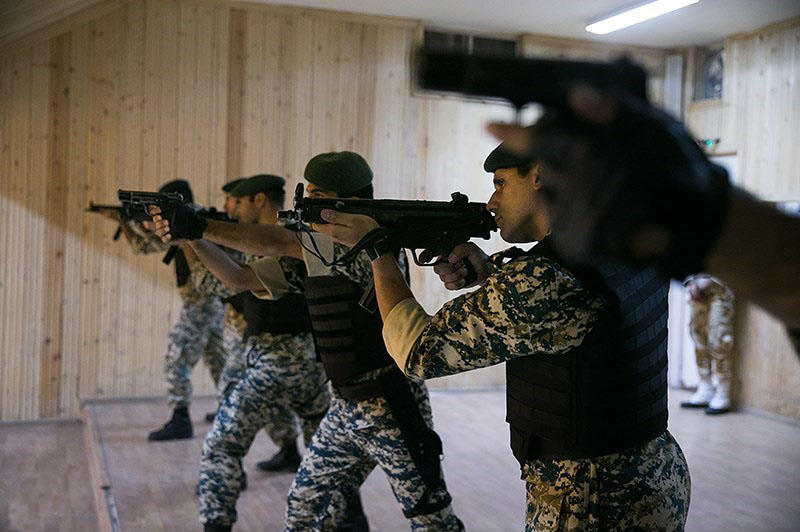
NOHED Brigade of Iran training with their MP5 along with their sidearm.

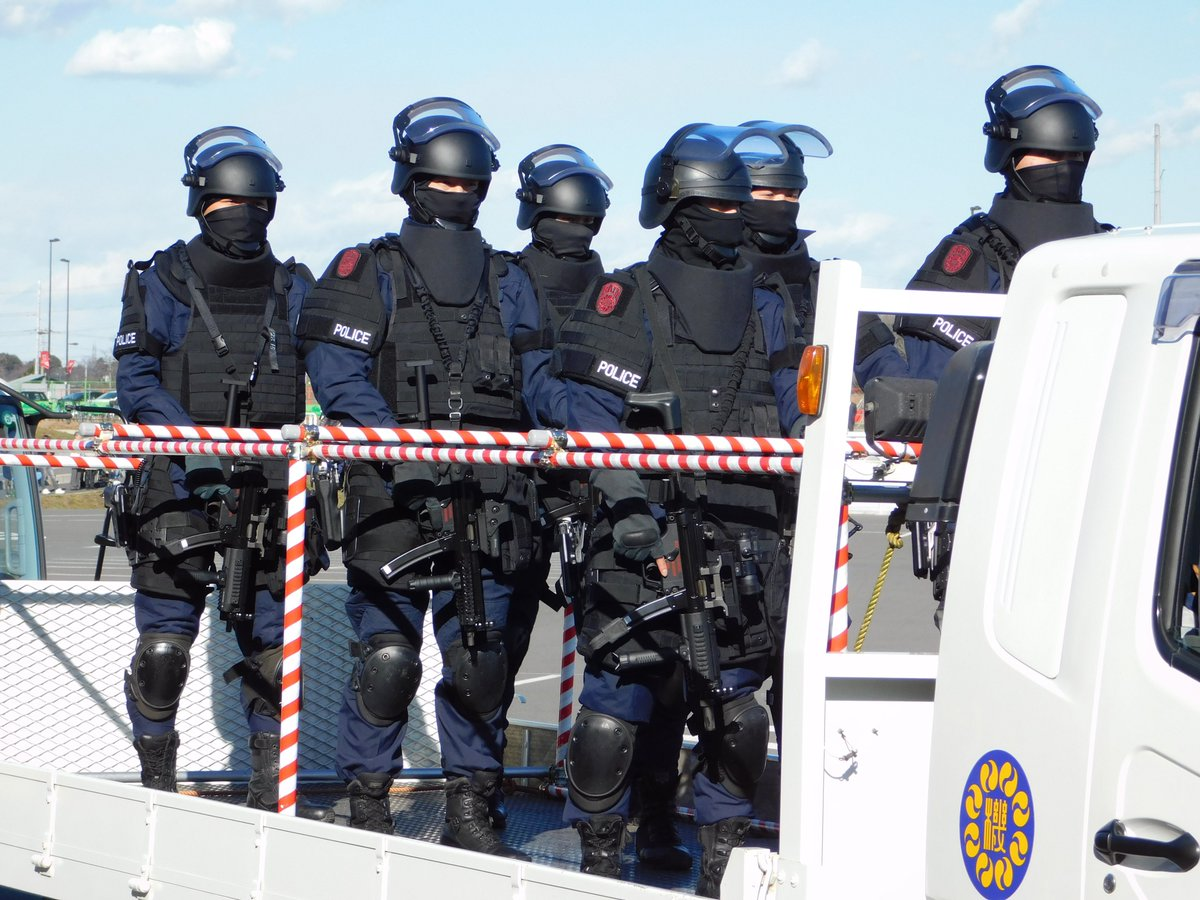
Anti-Firearms Squad of Japan armed with MP5 submachine guns. Some are equipped with Brügger & Thomet Foldable Visor Helmet Stocks.

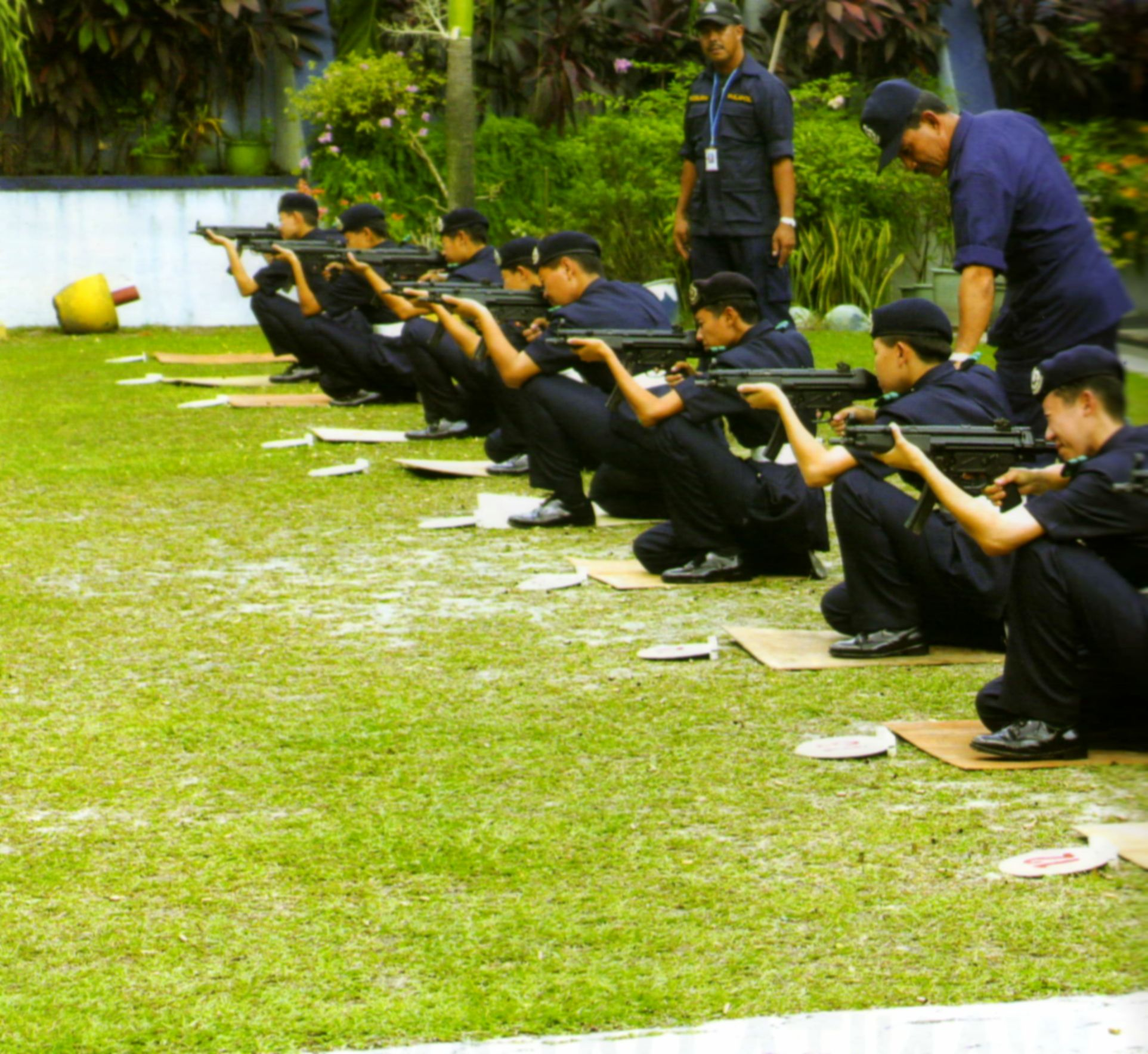
Recruits of the Royal Malaysia Police training with their MP5A3s.

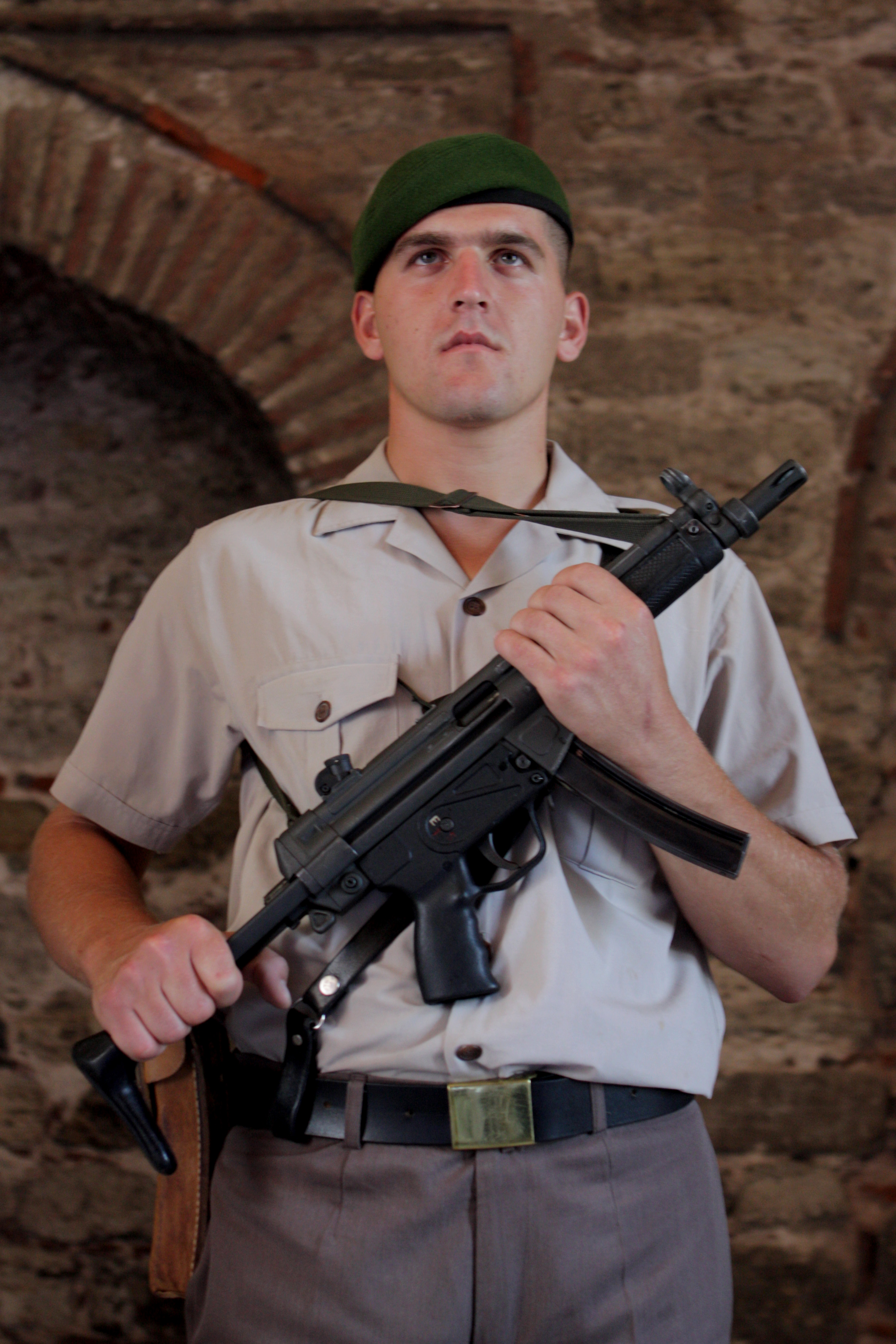
A Turkish gendarme with an MP5A3 at Topkapı Palace in Istanbul.

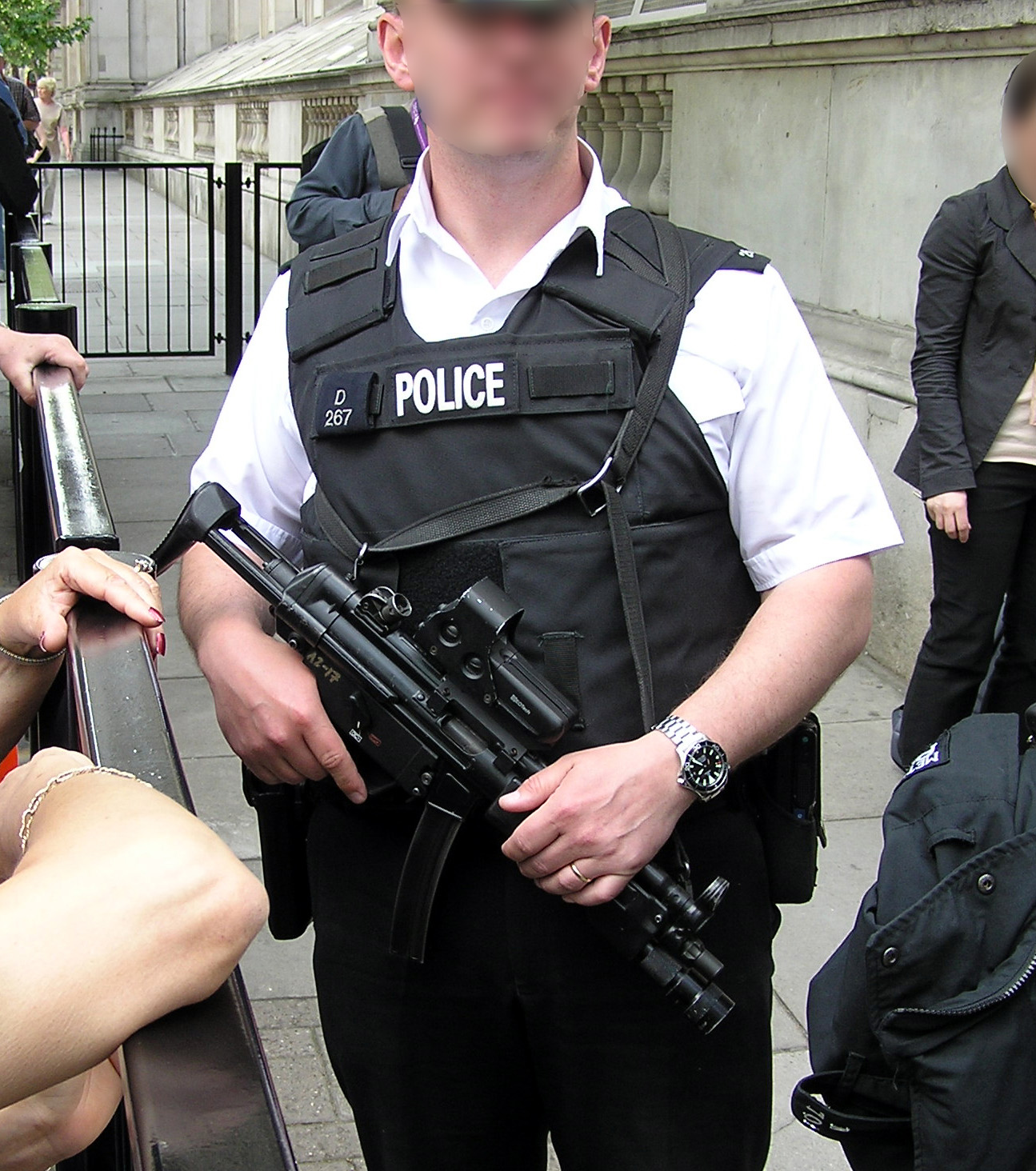
Police officer from Met police London England UK at Downing Street security holding an MP5SFA3.

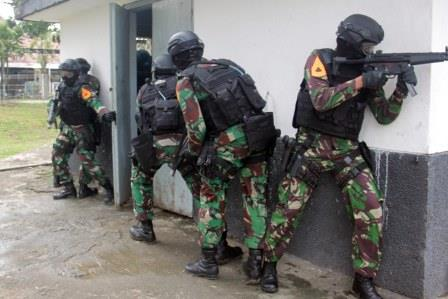
Indonesian Special Force Command (Kopassus) training with their MP5s

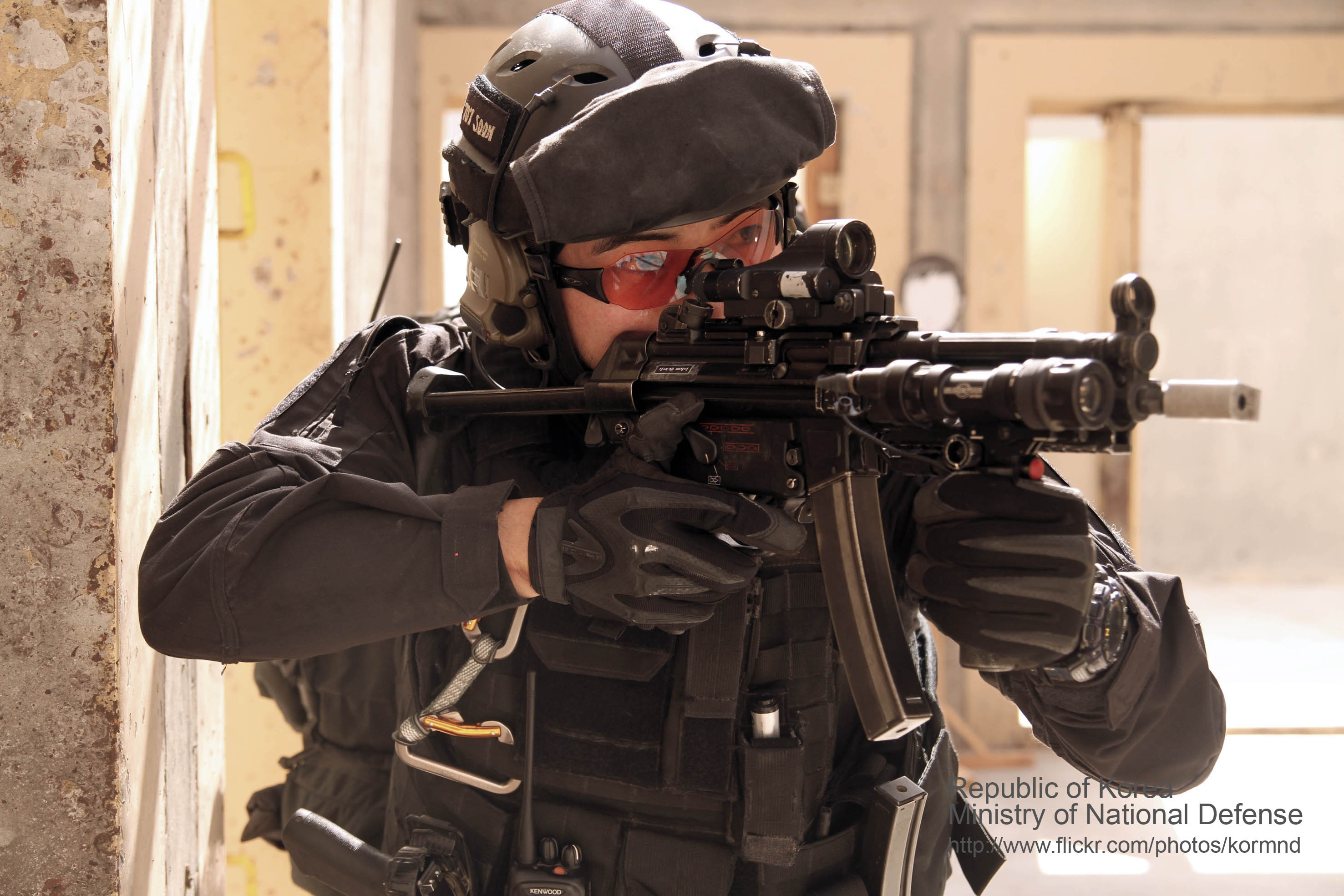
A member of South Korean Special Warfare Command fires an MP5A5.

The West German communist militant group the Red Army Faction (RAF) depicted the MP5 in their insignia, shown here.

== See also ==
- Colt M635
- List of delayed blowback firearms
- IMI Uzi
