= 72nd Brigade =

72nd Brigade may refer to:

== British India ==
- 72nd Indian Infantry Brigade

== Russia ==
- 72nd Separate Motor Rifle Brigade

== Serbia ==
- 72nd Assault Brigade of Serbia
- 72nd Brigade for Special Operations

== Slovenia ==
- 72nd Brigade (Slovenian Armed Forces)

== Ukraine ==
- 72nd Mechanized Brigade (Ukraine)

== United Kingdom ==
- 72nd Brigade (United Kingdom)

== United States ==
- 72nd Field Artillery Brigade (United States)
- 72nd Infantry Brigade Combat Team (United States)

== See also ==
- 72nd Division (disambiguation)
- 72nd Regiment (disambiguation)
