= Battalion "Hawks" =

Battalion for Special Operations "Falcons"
- Батаљон за специјалне операције "Соколови"
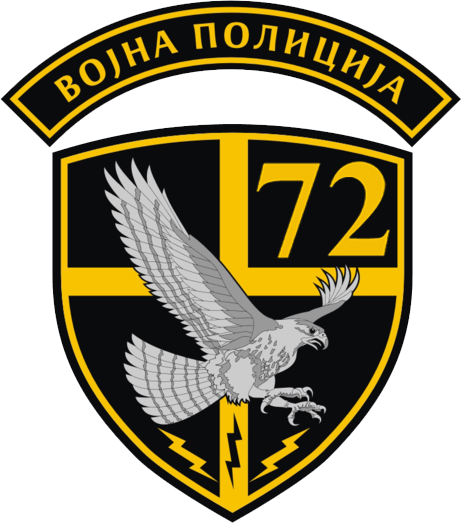
- Active: September 29, 1992
- Country: Serbia
- Branch: 72nd Brigade for Special Operations
- Type: Special operations Counter-terrorism
- Garrison/HQ: Pančevo

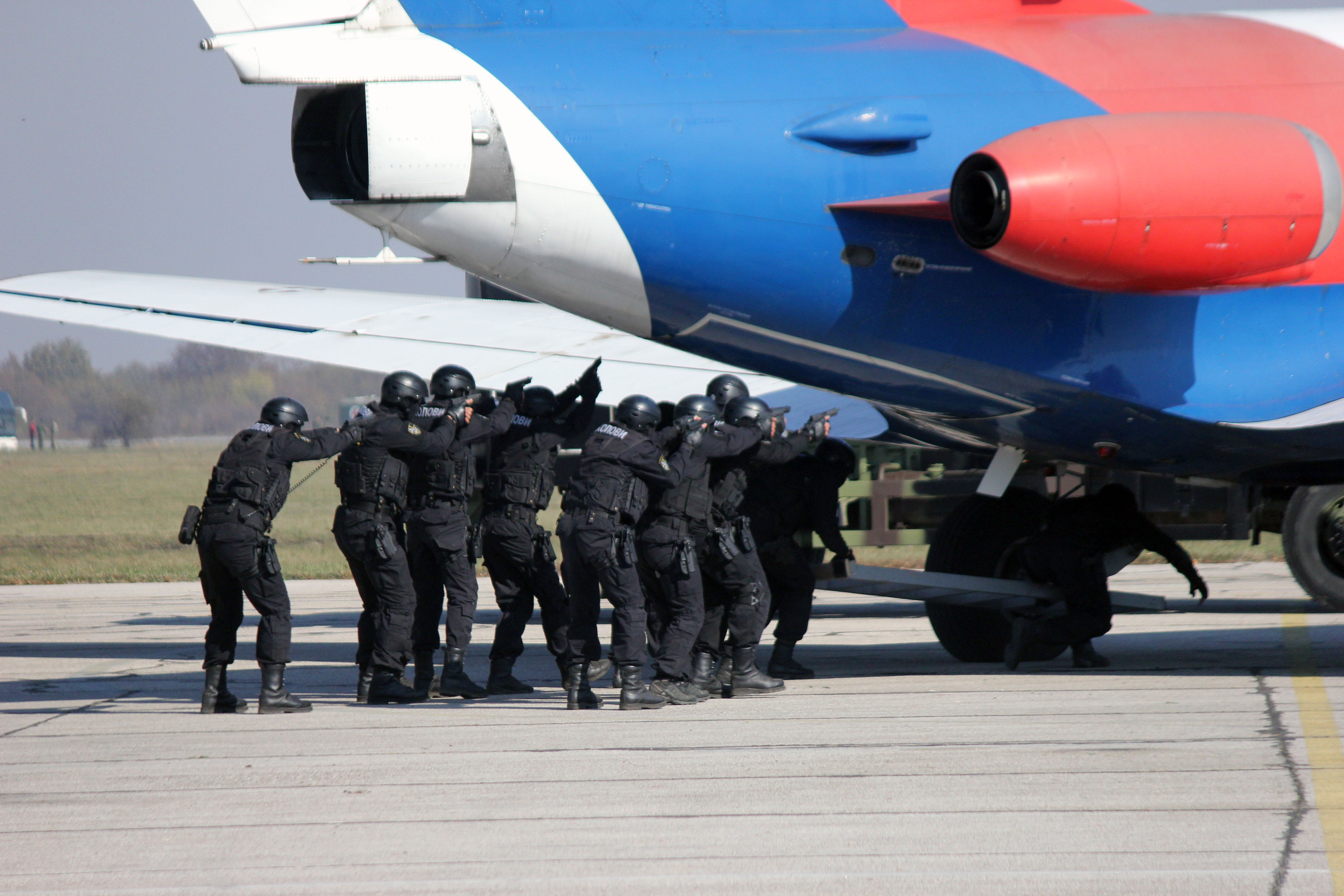
Members of Battalion "Hawks" at Batajnica Air Base during the Sloboda 2017 exercise.

The Вattalion for Special Operations "Hawks" (Serbian: Батаљон за специјалне операције "Соколови", romanized: Bataljon za specijalne operacije "Sokolovi") is a battalion within the 72nd Brigade for Special Operations of the Serbian Armed Forces. Formed in 1992 as a military police battalion for counter-terrorist operations within the newly formed 72nd Special Brigade, became counter-terrorist battalion "Hawks" in 2006 within the Special Brigade and with re-establishment of 72nd Brigade for Special Operations it was renamed to battalion for the special operations "Hawks" with broader range of tasks (not just counter-terrorism). Its main task is counter-terrorism. The symbol of the unit is the falcon.

== See also ==
- 72nd Brigade for Special Operations
- Battalion "Griffins"
