= 72nd Division =

72nd Division or 72nd Infantry Division may refer to:

== Artillery ==
- 72nd Division (People's Republic of China)
- 72nd Anti-Aircraft Artillery Division, Soviet Union

== Infantry ==
- 72nd Infantry Division (France)
- 72nd Infantry Division (Wehrmacht), Germany
- 72nd Division (Imperial Japanese Army)
- 72nd Infantry Division (Russian Empire)
- 72nd Motor Rifle Division, Russia
- 72nd Infantry Division (South Korea)
- 72nd Guards Rifle Division, Soviet Union, later the 72nd Guards Motor Rifle Division
- 72nd Mountain Rifle Division, Soviet Union
- 72nd Division (Spain)
- 72nd Division (Syria)
- 72nd Guards Mechanized Division, Ukraine
- 72nd Division (United Kingdom)
- 72nd Infantry Division (United States), planned during WWII but never formed

== See also ==
- List of military divisions by number
- 72nd Brigade (disambiguation)
- 72nd Regiment (disambiguation)
