= 72nd Infantry Division (South Korea) =

- Division insignia
- Active: 1 April 1987 - present
- Country: South Korea
- Branch: Republic of Korea Reserve Forces
- Type: Infantry
- Role: Reserve forces
- Size: Division
- Part of: Mobilization Force Command
- Garrison/HQ: Yangju, Gyeonggi
- Nickname(s): "Olympic"

Commanders
- Current commander: Brig. Gen. Kim Gyeong-bong

The 72nd Reserve Infantry Division (Korean: 제72동원보병사단) is a military formation of the Republic of Korea Reserve Forces (ROKA). The division is subordinated to the Mobilization Force Command and is headquartered in Yangju City, Gyeonggi Province. During the peacetime, they are in charge of recruit training and active as a second line military unit.

The division was created on 1 April 1987.

== Organization ==
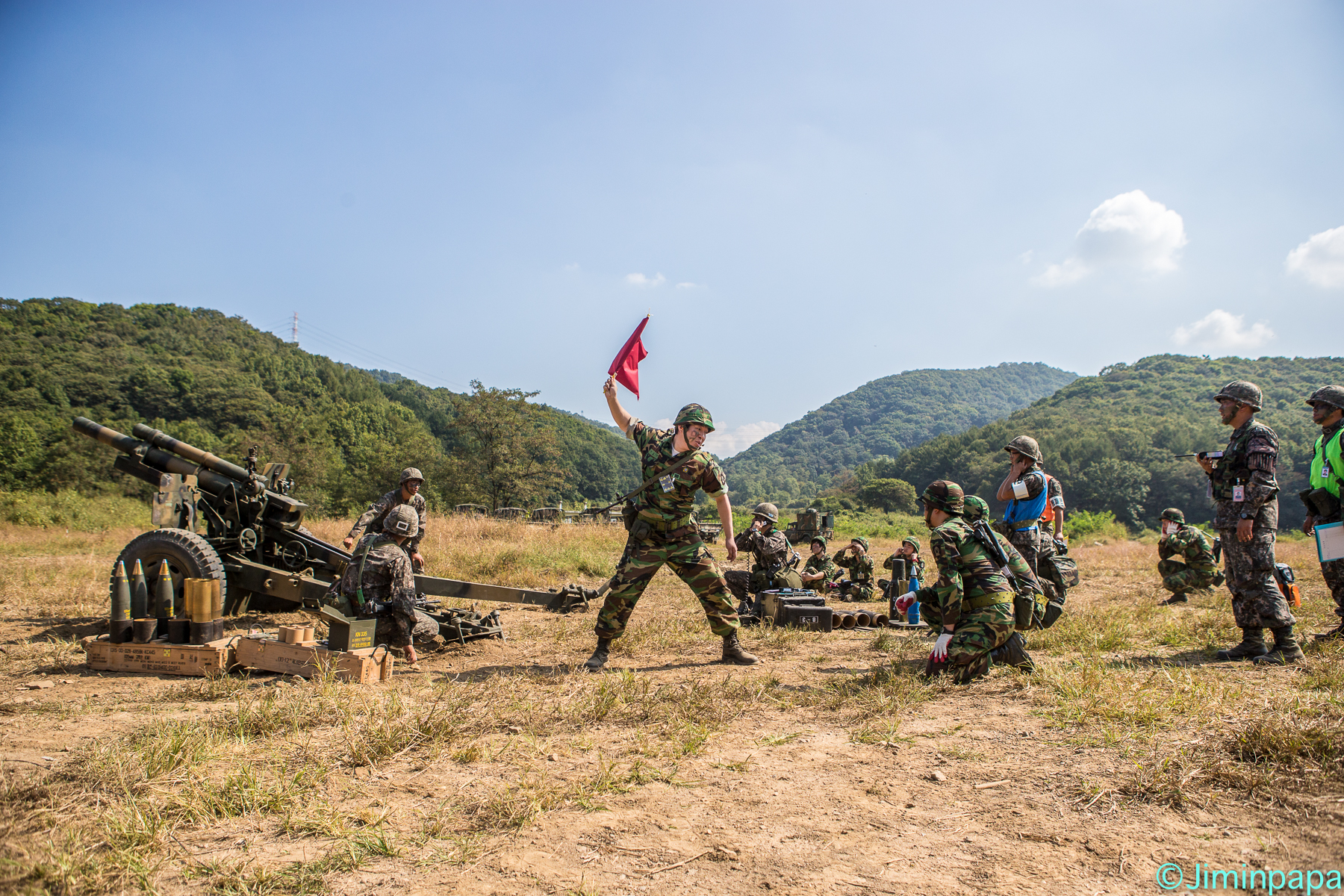
72nd Infantry Division soldiers training with M101 howitzer.

- Headquarters:
  - Headquarters Battalion
  - Reconnaissance Battalion
  - Engineer Battalion
  - Armor Battalion (M48A5K)
  - Chemical Company
  - Signal Battalion
  - Support Battalion
  - Medical Battalion
- 200th Infantry Brigade
- 201st Infantry Brigade
- 202nd Infantry Brigade
- Artillery Brigade
  - 3 Artillery Battalions (equipped with M101 howitzer)
  - Artillery Battalion (equipped with M114 howitzer)

== See also ==
- Korean Demilitarized Zone
