= 72nd Infantry Division (France) =

The 72nd Infantry Division (French: 72e Division d'Infanterie, 72e DI) was a French Army formation during World War I.

The division was a reserve formation of the French Army, based at Verdun. It was mobilised on 2 August 1914. On mobilisation it commanded the 351st, 362nd, 364th, 365th, and 366th Infantry Regiments and the 56th and 59th Battalions of Chasseurs à Pied. It formed part of the garrison of the Verdun fortress and was subordinated to the French 3rd Army.

The division remained in the Verdun region until August 1916 (during which it participated in the Battle of Verdun), when it was then moved north, where it then participated in the Battle of the Somme. In 1918 the division took part in the Second Battle of the Marne.

At the end of the war, only the 365th Infantry Regiment of the original force remained with the division, the other units having been posted away, amalgamated, or disbanded. In addition to this, the 1st Mixed Regiment of Zouaves and Tirailleurs, and the 31st Territorial Infantry Regiment formed part of the division.

At various times, it was part of the French First Army, French Second Army, French Third Army, French Fourth Army, French Fifth Army, French Sixth Army, French Seventh Army, French Tenth Army, Army of the Lorraine, GQGA and the Fortified Region of Verdun.
