= 72nd Brigade for Special Operations =

Special forces unit of the Serbian Armed Forces

- 72. бригада за специјалне операције
- Active: 1992–2006; 2019–present
- Country: Serbia
- Branch: Serbian General Staff
- Type: Special forces
- Role: Special Reconnaissance; Direct action Underwater demolition
- Part of: Serbian Armed Forces
- Garrison/HQ: Pančevo
- Nicknames: The Seventy-second (Sedamdesetdruga)
- Patron: Saint Sava
- Mottos: When others can't and don't dare, there is one... the 72nd that always can and dare! (Kada drugi ne mogu i ne smeju, samo je jedna... 72. koja uvek može i sme!)
- Anniversaries: 27 January
- Engagements: Yugoslav Wars

Commanders
- Current commander: Vacant

The 72nd Brigade for Special Operations (Serbian: 72. бригада за специјалне операције, romanized: 72. brigada za specijalne operacije) is a special forces unit, one of two special forces brigades (other being 63rd Parachute Brigade) of the Serbian Armed Forces. It is under the command of the General Staff and is based at Pančevo.

Formed in 1992, it was the elite unit of the Armed Forces of Serbia and Montenegro. Reconfigured in 2006 to a battalion within a newly-formed Serbian Armed Forces, the "72nd" regained the status of a brigade in 2019.

== History ==
The unit has its origins in the 72nd Special Brigade of Armed Forces of Serbia and Montenegro which was formed in 1992. It consisted of 1st reconnaissance-commando battalion, 2nd reconnaissance-commando battalion, MP battalion for counter-terrorist operations, and logistic unit. In 2006, 1st reconnaissance-commando battalion and 2nd reconnaissance-commando battalion merged into a single reconnaissance-commando battalion "Griffins", and battalion of military police for counter-terrorist operations became counter-terrorism battalion "Hawks".

== Structure ==
Although with a brigade status (in order to better honor traditions of the past), 72nd Brigade for Special Operations is currently more of a battalion-size unit with proclaimed aim of reaching size of a brigade in order to readdress new defense tasks due to increased security threats. It is organized into three battalions (two battalions for special operations, "Hawks" and "Griffins", and command battalion) as well as logistics company and a military police platoon. In addition, there is a diving unit (derived from 82nd Marine Center "Shadows" - Yugoslavia's version of the US Navy SEALs) which is part of the "Griffins" battalion.

- Command Battalion
- Battalion for Special Operations "Hawks" (counter-terrorism, direct action)
- Battalion for Special Operations "Griffins" (special reconnaissance, unconventional warfare)
  - 82nd River Underwater Demolition Company (river reconnaissance, underwater demolition and sabotage)
- Battalion for Special Operations "Eagles" (operational support) - to be formed
- Logistics Company
- MP platoon

== Missions ==
The 72nd Brigade for Special Operations is capable of fulfilling many different roles and to complete various list of tasks, such as: unconventional warfare, direct action, special reconnaissance, counterterrorism, counterinsurgency, information operations. They are also capable of hostage rescue and combat search and rescue if they are needed.

== Training ==
Enlisted soldiers have to have at least two years service experience in other units of the Serbian Armed Forces before applying for a position in the 72nd Brigade for Special Operations. Besides that, all candidates need to fulfill a lot of other requirements and only about two-thirds of all candidates pass the psychophysical tests.

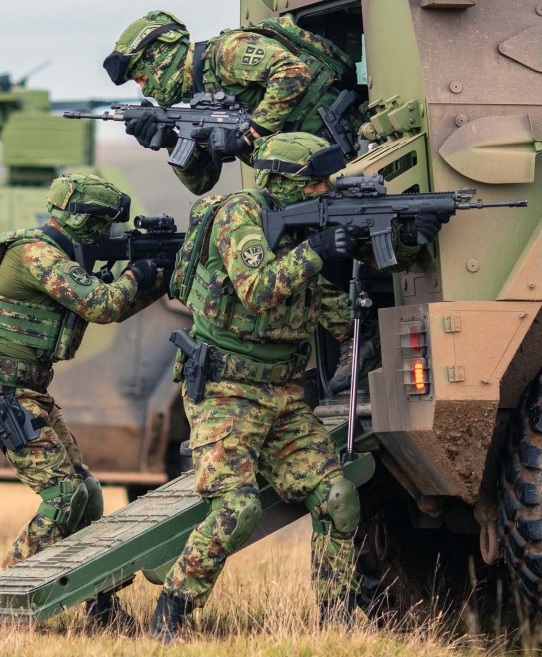
Members of the brigade at 2020 Sadejstvo exercise

Brigade uses various training grounds and shooting ranges and for training purposes, although most of it is conducted in unit's home base "Rastko Nemanjić" in Pančevo.

Training in the 72nd Brigade for Special Operations is divided in three stages and lasts for three years.

- Selective training is 9 weeks long. The focus of the training is aimed at selecting the best mentally and physically capable and highly motivated candidates that can withstand the challenges they may encounter during the service. During selective training candidates need to complete the following courses: physical training, shooting and fire training, tactical training, tactical training for special units, topography and orientation on the ground, and a final exam.
- Basic training is one-year long and consists of: physical training, shooting and fire training, tactical training, tactical training for special units, topography and orientation on the land, resources and systems for fire support, resources and procedures for telecommunications traffic and tactical exercises.
- Advanced training is two-years long and includes training through exchange rate revaluation, while attending the following courses: reconnaissance-commando, course for officers and non-commissioned officers, sniper course, training of survival in nature, mountaineering course, divers course, demolition course, and course about improvised explosive devices.

Candidate specialization and further training depends on which bataillon he is assigned to. Some parts of unit are focusing on reconnaissance or counter terrorism and some are trained for search and rescue. Also many members of the unit conduct training and courses in training centers abroad, through cooperation with the special units of other countries.

== Weapons and equipment ==
The assault rifle used by the 72nd Brigade for Special Operations is the FN SCAR L 5.56x45mm. The H&K UMP series are used for the close-quarter battle. The H&K USP is the standard sidearm carried by the soldiers. The FN Minimi is used as light machine gun, 5.56mm and 7.62mm, while domestically-produced Zastava M87 and Zastava M93 are used as heavy machine gun and anti-materiel rifle, respectively. Snipers use the Sako TRG 42. Underwater firearms used by the 82nd River Underwater Demolition Company include SPP-1 underwater pistol and APS underwater rifle.

The unit is equipped with domestically-produced Lazar 3 armored personnel carriers and Miloš light armored vehicles as well as with Mali Miloš unmanned ground vehicle. The utility vehicle of the brigade is Land Rover Defender. The 82nd River Underwater Demolition Company is equipped with 14 rigid infaltable boats of type RIB 720.

The 72nd Brigade for Special Operations is also equipped with Kornet anti-tank guided missile system.

== Traditions ==
=== Anniversary ===
The anniversary of the unit is celebrated on January 27.

=== Patron saint ===
The unit's slava or its patron saint is Saint Sava known as Savindan.

=== Motto ===
Motto of the Brigade is: "When others can't and don't dare, there is one... the 72nd that always can and dare!" (Kada drugi ne mogu i ne smeju, samo je jedna... 72. koja uvek može i sme!).

=== Colors ===
The 72nd wear maroon beret.

=== Decorations ===
Order of the War Banner (1999)

== See also ==
- 63rd Parachute Brigade
