= 72nd Street station =

72nd Street station may refer to:

- 72nd Street station (IRT Broadway–Seventh Avenue Line), a subway station
- 72nd Street station (IND Eighth Avenue Line), a subway station
- 72nd Street station (Second Avenue Subway), a subway station
- 72nd Street station (IRT Second Avenue Line), a demolished subway station
- 72nd Street station (IRT Ninth Avenue Line), a demolished subway station
- 72nd Street station (New York Central Railroad)

== See also ==
- 72nd Street (Manhattan), a major bidirectional crosstown street in New York City
