= 72 =

72 may refer to:

- 72 (number), the natural number following 71 and preceding 73
- One of the years 72 BC, AD 72, 1972, 2072
- "72", by James from the album Hey Ma
- 72 Feronia, a main-belt asteroid
- Tatra 72, an army off-road truck
- Audi 72, a compact executive car
- 72 Seasons, an album by the band Metallica

== See also ==
- 72nd (disambiguation)
- List of highways numbered 72
