= Battalion "Griffins" =

Battalion for Special Operations "Griffins"
- Батаљон за специјалне операције "Грифони"
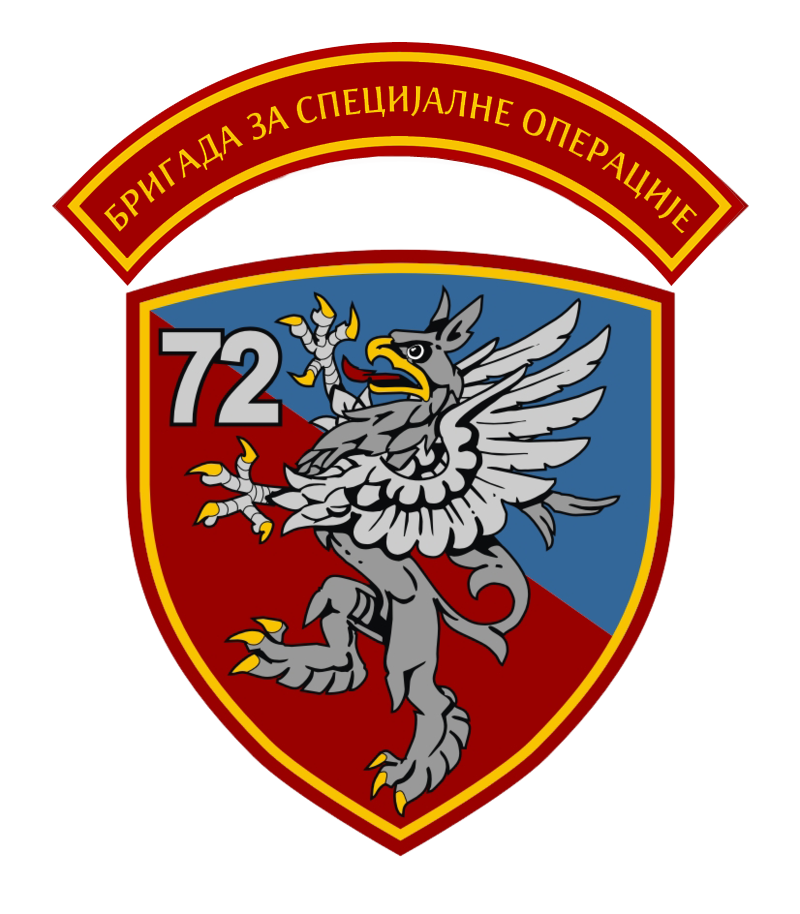
- Active: June 12, 1992
- Country: Serbia
- Branch: 72nd Brigade for Special Operations
- Type: Special operations forces
- Role: Reconnaissance-Commando
- Garrison/HQ: Pančevo

The Battalion for Special Operations "Griffins" (Serbian: Батаљон за специјалне операције "Грифони", romanized: Bataljon za specijalne operacije "Grifoni") is part of 72nd Brigade for Special Operations of the Serbian Armed Forces. Its main tasks are reconnaissance, commando actions and sabotage and demolition. The symbol of the unit is the griffin.

== History ==
With establishment of 72nd Special Brigade in 1992 there were 1st reconnaissance-commando battalion and 2nd reconnaissance-commando battalion. Those two battalions merged in 2006 into single reconnaissance-commando battalion "Griffins".

== Training ==
Range of combat training is very broad and includes tactical, fire and physical training of the highest professional risk. In addition to a very demanding selective training, further training is conducted:

- Training in the use of cold weapons, the implementation of martial art skills, the use of weapons with high firepower
- Training complex action tactics of special operations
- Training in parachuting, diving, swimming, climbing and rescue services

== 82nd River Underwater Demolition Company ==
Part of the battalion is 82nd River Underwater Demolition Company (frogmen, river reconnaissance, underwater demolition and sabotage) diving unit. It is derived from 82nd Marine Center "Shadows" - Yugoslavia's version of the Navy SEALs.

== See also ==
- 72nd Brigade for Special Operations
- Battalion "Hawks"
