= 72nd Regiment =

72nd Regiment or 72nd Infantry Regiment may refer to:

- 72nd Infantry Regiment (France), former an infantry regiment of the French Army
- 72nd Regiment of Foot (1758), former regiment of the British Army, 1758–1763
- 72nd (Hampshire) Heavy Anti-Aircraft Regiment, Royal Artillery, a British Yeomanry unit.
- 72nd Regiment, Duke of Albany's Own Highlanders, a former unit of the British Army, 1778-1881
- 72nd Regiment of Bengal Native Infantry, a former unit of the British Indian Army
- 72nd Regiment "Seaforth Highlanders of Canada", Canadian reserve regiment

American Civil War

- 72nd Illinois Volunteer Infantry Regiment, a unit of the Union (Northern) Army
- 72nd Indiana Infantry Regiment, a unit of the Union (Northern) Army
- 72nd New York Volunteer Infantry Regiment, a unit of the Union (Northern) Army
- 72nd Ohio Infantry, a unit of the Union (Northern) Army
- 72nd Pennsylvania Infantry, a unit of the Union (Northern) Army

== See also ==
- 72nd Division (disambiguation)
