= Task Force 71 =

Naval task force of the United States Navy, active since the 1940s

Task Force 71 (TF-71) has been a naval task force of the United States Navy, active since the 1940s. The Task Force also used to fulfill the function of Command and Coordination Force, Seventh Fleet. The Seventh Fleet Command Ship is USS Blue Ridge, based at U.S. Fleet Activities Yokosuka, Yokosuka, Japan. In 2004, Blue Ridge entered dry dock and the responsibility was transferred temporarily to USS Coronado. Blue Ridge returned to duty 27 September 2004.

== World War II and after ==
Task Force 71 was based in Fremantle, Western Australia in 1941–42, operating submarines under Rear Admiral Charles A. Lockwood. He was relieved by Rear Admiral Ralph W. Christie on 7 March 1943.

Soon after the war, Task Force 71 was designated as the North China Force. Its mission was to support the US occupation of southern Korea. This included executing various show-the-flag operations along the western coast of Korea as well as in the Bohai Sea. These naval demonstrations preceded Operation Campus, the amphibious landing of U.S. Army ground forces at Incheon, Korea, on 8 September 1945. USS Alaska and USS Guam both served with the task force. Subsequently, both returned to the United States in mid-December 1945, ahead of being decommissioned.

During the first half of 1965, the Seventh Fleet operationally controlled the Vietnam Patrol Force (Task Force 71), the American component of the Operation Market Time effort. The Naval Advisory Group, headquartered in Saigon, served as the liaison between the fleet, Commander U.S. Military Assistance Command, Vietnam, and the South Vietnamese Navy. On 31 July 1965, formal control of the U.S. Operation Market Time force passed from the Seventh Fleet to the Naval Advisory Group, which in turn activated the Coastal Surveillance Force (Task Force 115). The fleet continued to provide logistic and administrative support. The command function was further refined on 1 April 1966 when Naval Forces, Vietnam, was established, relieving the Naval Advisory Group of responsibility for Market Time operations.

== Korean DMZ Crisis ==
Also referred to as a Second Korean War, the Korean DMZ Conflict was a series of low-level armed clashes between North Korean forces and the forces of South Korea and the United States, largely occurring between 1966 and 1969 at the Korean DMZ. The number of incidents along the DMZ jumped from 37 in 1966 to 435 in 1967, with a combined 1967 total of 371 fatalities involving North Korea, South Korea, and United Nations forces while there were no fatalities in 1966 (see chart). Also, during 1967, there were two sabotage attempts to disrupt South Korea railroad operations, the first such attempts since the Korean War. Additionally, in 1967, a South Korean patrol vessel was sunk by North Korea shore batteries over a fishing dispute, with thirty-nine of the 79-man crew killed. Finally, in the most overt incident to date, North Korean commandos from Unit 124 unsuccessfully attempted to assassinate the South Korea president Park Chung Hee at the presidential residence Blue House in Seoul, South Korea, on 21 January 1968.

=== 1968 Pueblo incident ===
Task Force 71 was the centerpiece for Operation Formation Star, the code name for the emergency re-deployment of U.S. Seventh Fleet warships to the Sea of Japan off the eastern coast of North Korea following that country's seizure of USS Pueblo (AGER-2) in international waters on 23 January 1968. Effective 25 January 1968, in conjunction with Operation Combat Fox, Operation Formation Star was initiated. Taken together, both operations represented a major surge deployment of U.S. naval and air forces into the Sea of Japan region off the eastern coast of North Korea, the largest since the end of the Korean War. Although not directly unrelated to Operation Formation Star, the Republic of Korea Navy also dispatched nineteen ships and two fast patrol boats to sixteen patrol zones around South Korea. Concurrently with Operation Formation Star and Operation Combat Fox, U.S. President Lyndon B. Johnson signed Executive Order 11392 ordering certain units of the Ready Reserve of the Naval Reserve, Air Force Reserve, and Air National Guard of the United States to active duty. For the U.S. Naval Reserve, this call-up involved six naval air squadrons and two Seabee construction battalions for a total of 1621 naval reservists activated. Taken together, as noted by Secretary of Defense Robert S. McNamara, the purpose of this build-up/call-up was to provide a "measured show of force" in support of the diplomatic effort to resolve the Pueblo crisis peacefully.

==== Task Force 71, 1968 ====
Naval Aviation Units			Screening Force					Logistical Support
Command	Aircraft Carriers	Carrier Air Wing	Cruisers / DLG	Destroyers / DDG	Destroyers	Destroyers	Destroyers / Destroyer Escorts	TF-73 Detachment
Carrier Division 1	USS Enterprise (CVAN-65) (flagship)	Carrier Air Wing 9	USS Canberra (CAG-2)	USS Lynde McCormick (DDG-8)	USS Everett F. Larson (DD-830)	USS Buck (DD-761)	USS Renshaw (DD-499)	USS Sacramento (AOE-1)
Carrier Division 3	USS Ranger (CVA-61)	Carrier Air Wing 2	USS Chicago (CG-11)	USS John R. Craig (DD-885)	USS Higbee (DDR-806)	USS Strong (DD-758)	USS O'Bannon (DDE-450)	USS Platte (AO-24)
Carrier Division 7	USS Coral Sea (CVA-43)	Carrier Air Wing 15	USS Providence (CLG-6)	USS Leonard F. Mason (DD-852)	USS James E. Kyes (DD-787)	USS John A. Bole (DD-755)	USS Radford (DD-446)	USS Tolovana (AO-64)
(NAVAIRPAC)	USS Ticonderoga (CVA-14)	Carrier Air Wing 19	USS Truxtun (DLGN-35)	USS Ozbourn (DD-846)	USS Henderson (DD-785)	USS Frank E. Evans (DD-754)	USS Bradley (DE-1041)	USS Mars (AFS-1)
(NAVAIRPAC)	USS Kearsarge (CVS-33)	ASW Air Group 53	USS Halsey (DLG-23)	USS Herbert J. Thomas (DD-833)	USS McKean (DD-784)	USS Taussig (DD-746)	USS Brooke (DEG-1)	USS Vesuvius (AE-15)
ASW Group 1	USS Yorktown (CVS-10)	ASW Air Group 55	USS Dewey (DLG-14)	USS Hanson (DD-832)	USS Rowan (DD-782)	USS Collett (DD-730)	——	USS Samuel Gompers (AD-37)

=== 1969 North Korean EC-121 shootdown ===
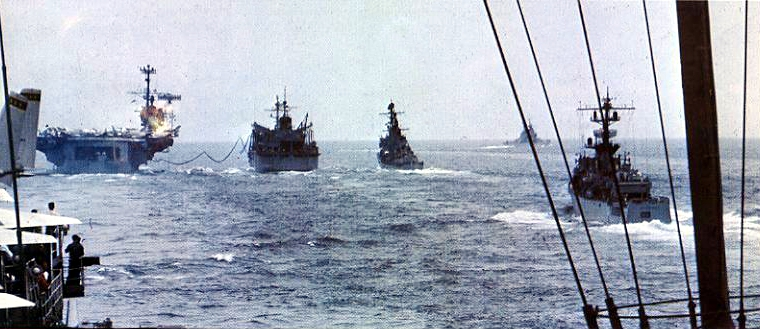
Ships of Task Force 71 underway off North Korea in April 1969.

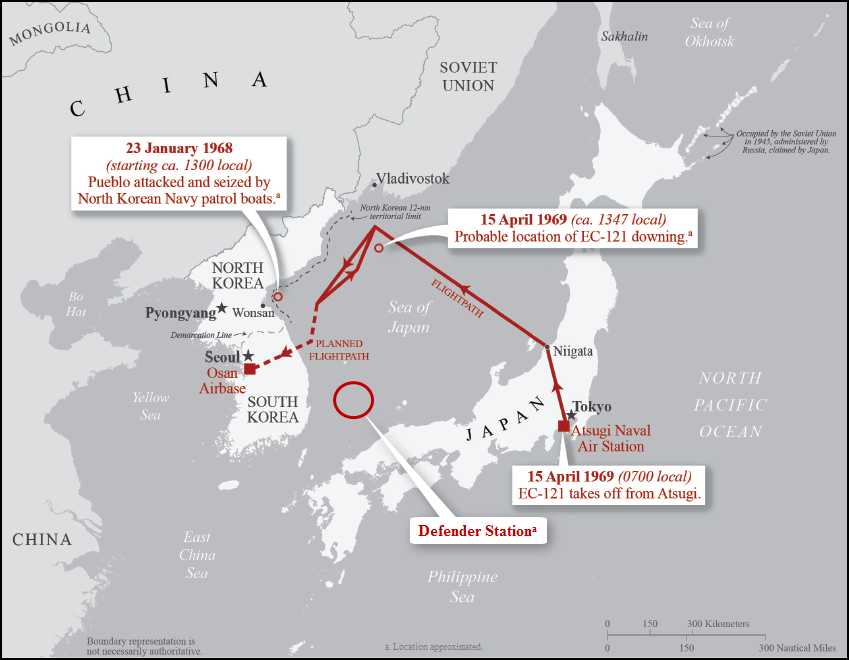
Defender Station

The US responded to the 1969 EC-121 shootdown incident by activating Task Force 71 to protect future flights over international waters neighbouring North Korea. Initially, the Task Force comprised the aircraft carriers Enterprise, Ticonderoga, Ranger, and Hornet with a screen of cruisers and destroyers that also included the battleship New Jersey. The ships for TF-71 came mostly from Southeast Asia duty. This deployment became one of the largest shows of force in the area since the Korean War.

Following the attack, some, including Representative Mendel Rivers responded to the attack by calling for retaliation against North Korea. On 16 April, the United States National Security Council considered the following options:

- Show of force using naval and air forces
- Resumption of EC-121 missions with escorts
- "Select military combat actions" such as:
  - Destruction of a North Korean aircraft over water
  - Selected air strikes against a military target
  - Shore bombardment of military targets
  - Ground raids across the Demilitarized Zone
  - Attack on military targets near the Demilitarized Zone by artillery or missile fire
  - Attacks on North Korean naval vessels by U.S. submarines
  - Blockade
  - Mining/threatening to mine North Korean waters
  - Seizure of North Korean assets abroad

In addition to the NSC's ideas, the Joint Chiefs of Staff prepared several plans to bomb the airfield at Sondok and Wonsan. If all went according to plan, bombers would attack the airfields under cover of night. CINCPAC proposed the positioning of ships, with missiles capable of taking down planes, in the Sea of Japan with orders to destroy North Korean aircraft, impound other North Korean vessels venturing into international waters (fishing boats, etc.), and fire onto the shore (especially near Wonsan).

In the end, no action was taken against the North Koreans in the days following the attack. The new Nixon administration had little to no information about the location and availability of both U.S. and North Korean forces, as the administration had difficulty communicating with those in the Pacific. By the time this information was communicated to the planners, it was too late to react. Both Nixon and Secretary of State Henry Kissinger were ashamed at the outcome of the event, with Kissinger revealing that "our conduct in the EC-121 crisis as weak, indecisive and disorganized." Once it became clear that no action would be taken against the North Koreans, Nixon promised that "they'll [North Koreans] never get away with it again," and ordered a "resumption of aerial reconnaissance flights."

==== Task Force 71, 1969 ====
Carrier Groups			Screening Force				
Command	Aircraft Carriers	Carrier Air Wing	Battleships / Cruisers	DLG / DDG	Destroyers	Destroyers	Destroyer Escorts
Carrier Division 7	USS Enterprise (CVAN-65)	Carrier Air Wing 9	USS New Jersey (BB-62)	USS Sterett (DLG-31)	USS Richard B. Anderson (DD-786)	USS Ernest G. Small (DD-838)	USS Davidson (DE-1045)
Carrier Division 3	USS Ranger (CVA-61)	Carrier Air Wing 2	USS Chicago (CG-11)	USS Dale (DLG-19)	USS Meredith (DD-890)	USS Gurke (DD-783)	——
Carrier Division 9	USS Ticonderoga (CVA-14)	Carrier Air Wing 16	USS Oklahoma City (CLG-5)	USS Mahan (DLG-11)	USS Henry W. Tucker (DD-875)	USS Lyman K. Swenson (DD-729)	——
ASW Group 5	USS Hornet (CVS-12)	ASW Air Group 57	USS Saint Paul (CA-73)	USS Parsons (DDG-33)	USS Perry (DD-844)	USS John W. Weeks (DD-701)	——
——	——	——	——	USS Lynde McCormick (DDG-8)	USS Shelton (DD-790)	USS Radford (DD-446)	——

Major naval units of Task Force 71
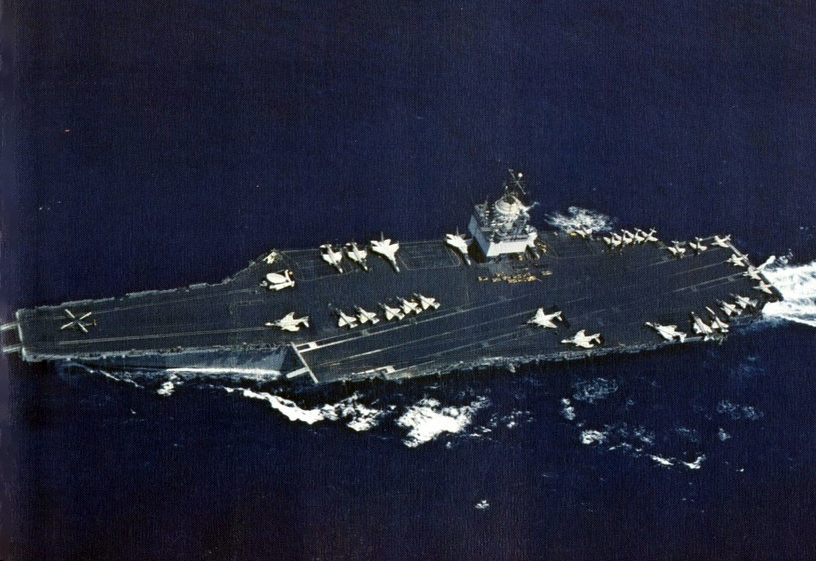
USS Enterprise (CVAN-65), flagship

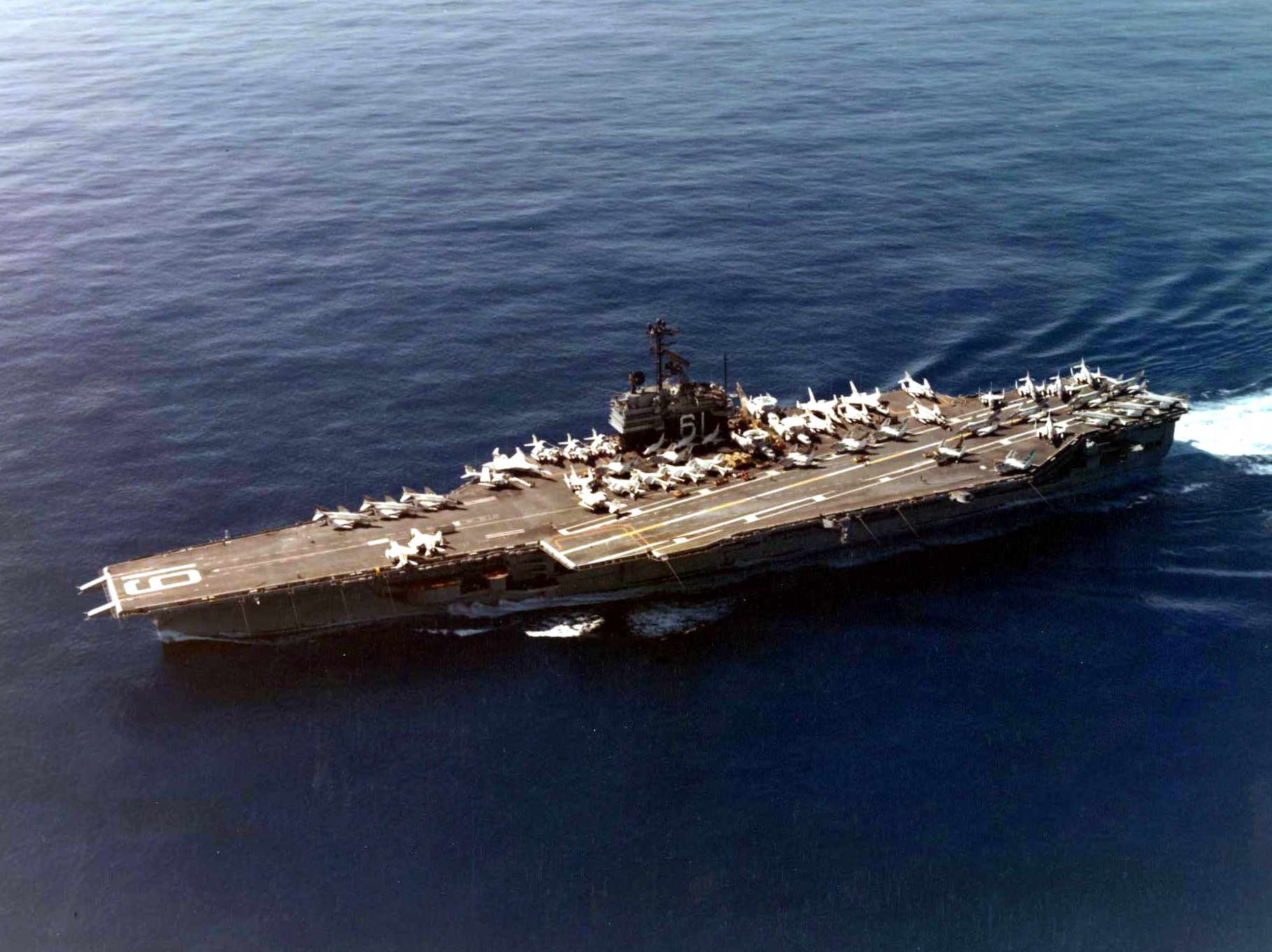
USS Ranger (CVA-61)

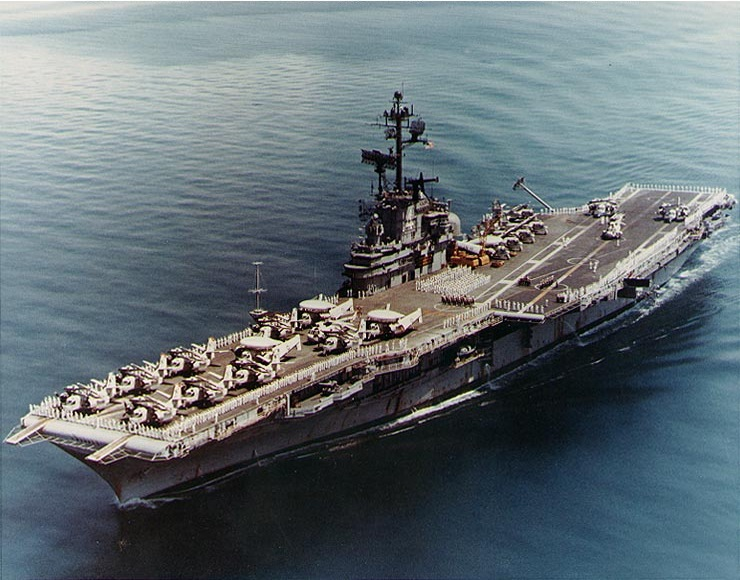
USS Ticonderoga (CVA-14)

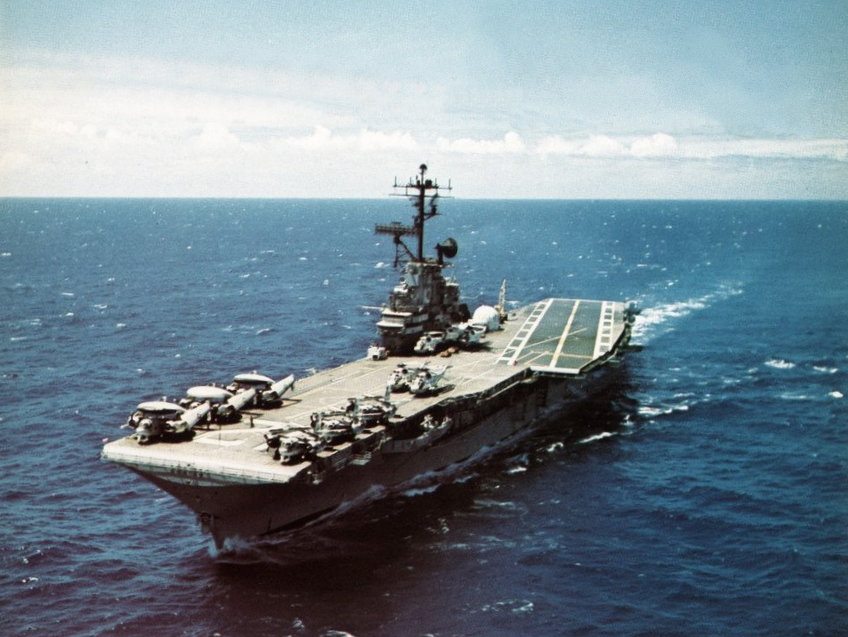
USS Hornet (CVS-12)

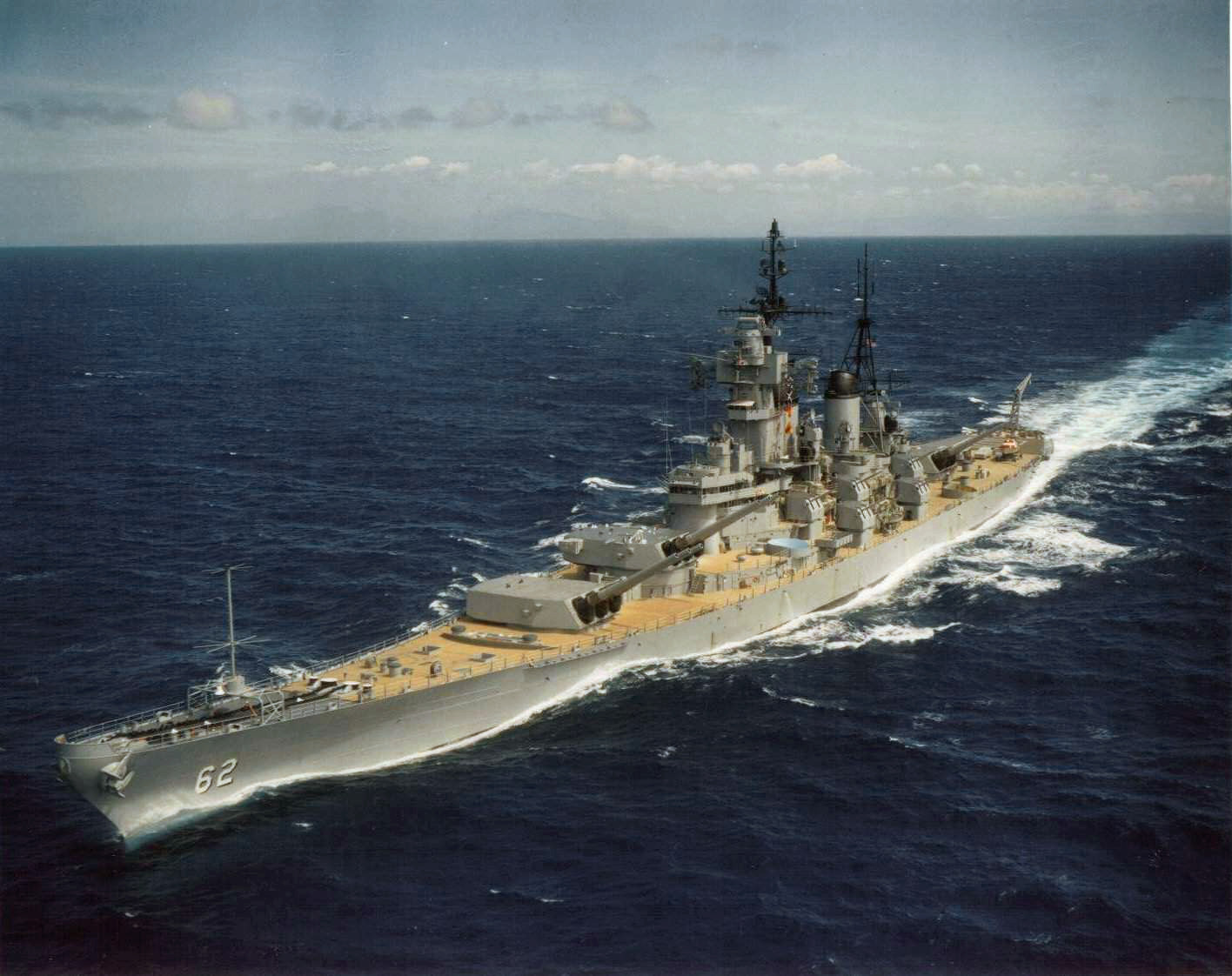
USS New Jersey (BB-62)

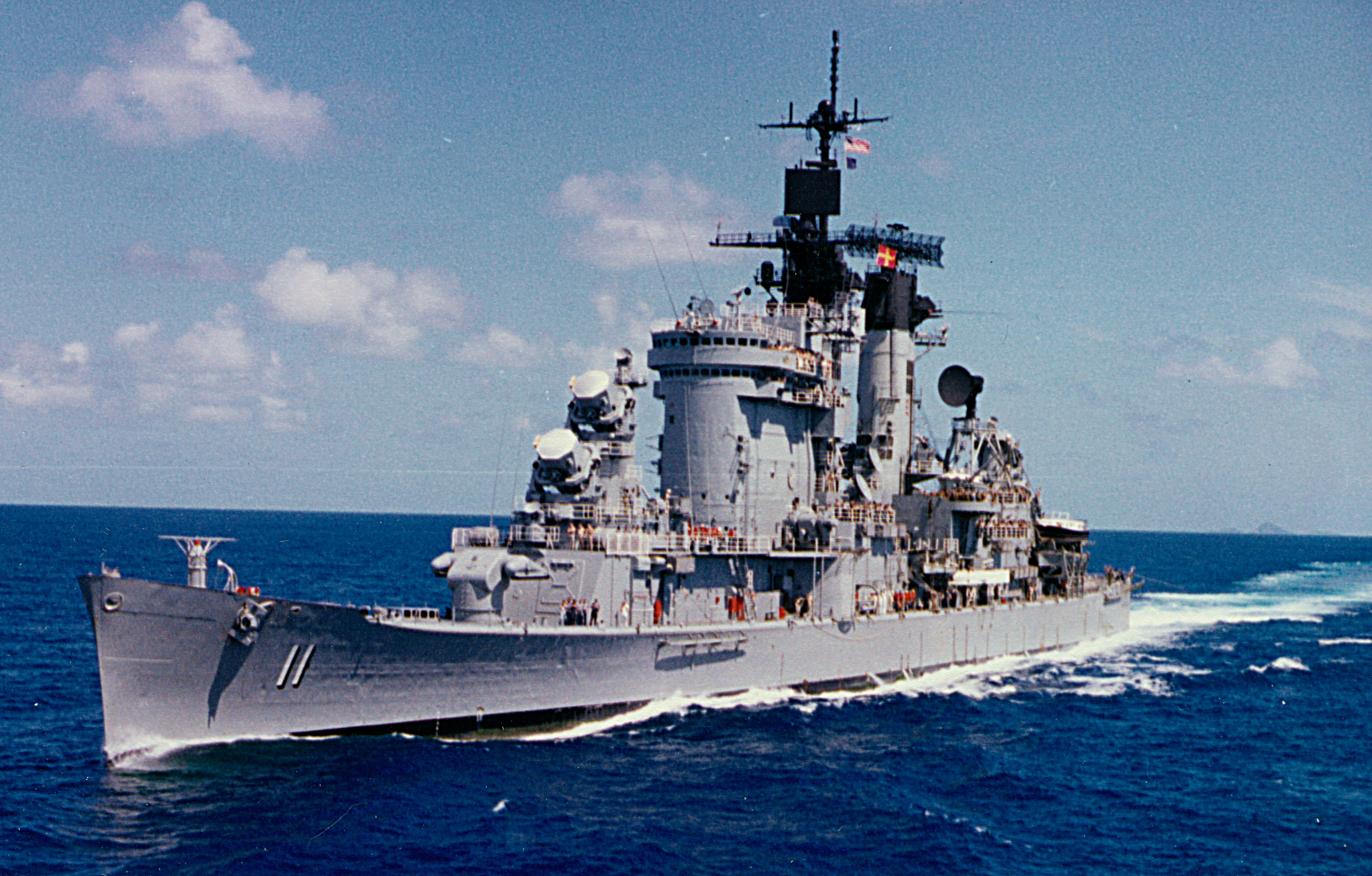
USS Chicago (CG-11)

== KAL 007 shootdown ==
Task Force 71 operated the Search and Rescue/Salvage Operations for Korean Air Lines Flight 007 shot down by the Soviets off Sakhalin Island on 1 September 1983. On the day of the shootdown, Rear Admiral William A. Cockell, Commander, Task Force 71, and a skeleton staff, taken by helicopter from Japan, embarked in USS Badger (FF-1071), which had been stationed off Vladivostok at time of the flight. Cockell was transferred again on 9 September to the destroyer USS Elliot to assume duties as Officer in Tactical Command (OTC) of the Search and Rescue (SAR) effort. Surface search began immediately and on into the 13-day of September. U.S. underwater operations began on 14 September. With no further hope of finding survivors, on 10 September 1983, the Task Force's mission had been reclassified "Search and Salvage" operation from a "Search and Rescue". On 17 October 1983, Rear Admiral William Cockell was relieved of command of the Task Force and its Search and Salvage mission, and Rear Admiral Walter T. Piotti Jr., was placed in command.

There were three U.S. search and salvage ships involved—the Coast Guard cutter USCGC Douglas Munro, the rescue salvage ship USS Conserver, and the Fleet Tug USNS Narragansett. There were also three Japanese tugs chartered through the U.S. Navy's Far East Salvage Contractor (Selco), these were the Ocean Bull, the Kaiko-Maru 7, and the Kaiko-Maru 3. Aside from these vessels, there were the U.S. naval combatants and logistical support ships. These were USS Elliot, USS Badger, USS Sterett, USNS Hassayampa, USS Callaghan, USS Brooke, USS Meyerkord, USS Towers, USS Stark and USS Wichita. In addition to the above ships, there were numerous Japanese Maritime Safety Agency patrol boats and South Korean vessels involved.

== Recent activities ==
In 2021 Task Force 71 was reactivated as the Theater Surface Warfare Commander (TSUWC) for the Western Pacific to formalize the command and control of assigned naval surface forces within the U.S. 7th Fleet area of operations. CTF 71 also serves as the sea combat commander for the Forward Deployed Naval Forces-Japan Carrier Strike Group and maritime interdiction operations commander.

“We have integrated the Surface Task Force (TF 71) into the 7th Fleet combat scheme of maneuver, theater security cooperation events, and crisis response efforts,” said Vice Adm. Bill Merz, commander, U.S. 7th Fleet. “This was a natural organizational adjustment that reflects the increasing pace of operations throughout the region and is similar in structure to other numbered fleets. We've already enjoyed considerable and measurable improvements in combat readiness, task assignment, and overall mission effectiveness.”

As of 2023 the command and control of Task Force 71 is assigned to Destroyer Squadron 15 and consists of the nine US Guided Missile Destroyers forward deployed to Japan, independent Cruiser and Destroyer deployments to Seventh Fleet, Title 10 deployments of U.S. Coast Guard Cutters, and a number of Allied and partner navy surface combatant contributions to coalition operations throughout the Western Pacific.
