= Blue House raid =

1968 North Korean raid in South Korea

- Part of the Korean DMZ Conflict and the Cold War
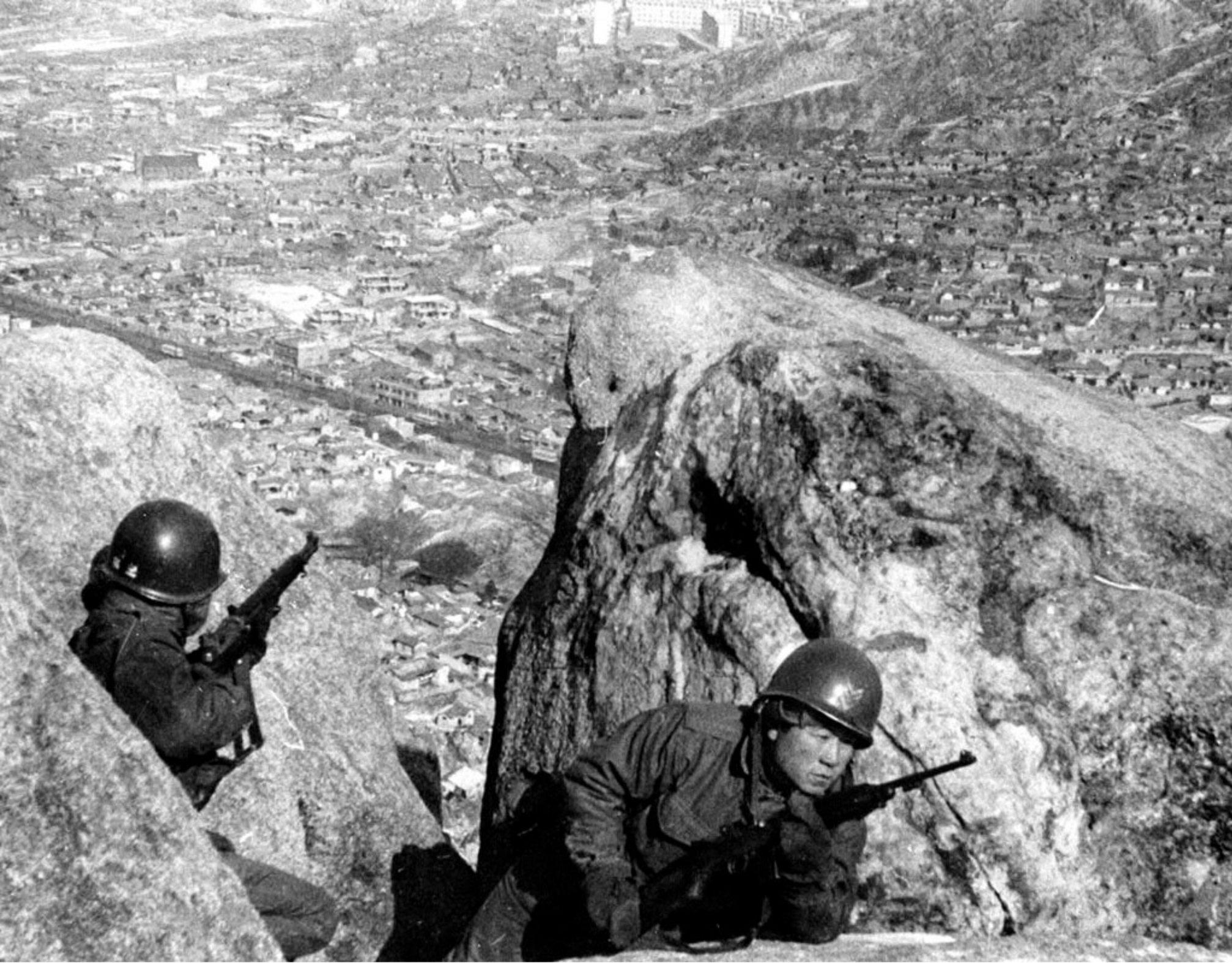
- South Korean forces search for North Korean commandos following the initial conflict on January 21
Date	January 17, 1968 – January 29, 1968 (1 week and 5 days)
Location	Blue House, Seoul, South Korea
Result	South Korean and U.S. victory

Belligerents
South Korea; United States	North Korea

Commanders and leaders
Park Chung Hee; Charles Bonesteel	Kim Il Sung

Units involved
25th Infantry Division; 26th Infantry Division (elements); 2nd Infantry Division (elements); 7th Infantry Division (elements)	Unit 124

Casualties and losses
26 killed 4 killed	29 killed and/or committed suicide 1 captured 1 escaped

- Blue House raid
- Hangul: 1·21 사태
- Hanja: 1·21 事態
- RR: 1·21 satae
- MR: 1·21 sat'ae

The Blue House raid, also known in South Korea as the January 21 Incident (Korean: 1·21 사태), was a raid launched by North Korean commandos in an attempt to assassinate President of South Korea Park Chung Hee in his residence at the Blue House in Seoul, on January 21, 1968. A 31-man team of the Korean People's Army (KPA) infiltrated the DMZ but was intercepted by police near the presidential residence. In the ensuing pursuit, all but two commandos were killed; one was captured (Kim Shin-jo), and one (Pak Jae-gyong) fled back to North Korea. South Korean casualties totaled 26 killed and 66 wounded, including about 24 civilians; four Americans also were killed. Park was unharmed.

== Background ==
Park Chung Hee seized power in a 1961 coup d'état and ruled as a military strongman until his election and inauguration as the President of South Korea in 1963. The attack at the Blue House took place in the context of the Korean DMZ Conflict (1966–69), which in turn was influenced by the Vietnam War.

Following the 1967 South Korean presidential election and the legislative election, the North Korean leadership concluded that Park's domestic opposition no longer constituted a serious challenge to his rule.

In July 1967, a special squad of the recently established Unit 124 of the Korean People's Army (KPA) was entrusted with the task of assassinating Park. This decision was probably facilitated by the fact that in 1967, the Vietnam War entered a new stage of escalation, and American military forces, preoccupied as they were with Vietnam, could not easily take retaliatory measures against North Korea. In 1965–1968, North Korea–North Vietnam relations were very close, and North Korea provided substantial military and economic assistance to North Vietnam.

North Korean propaganda sought to depict the post-1966 commando raids as a South Korean guerrilla movement akin to the Viet Cong.

== Preparations ==
Thirty-one men were handpicked from the elite all-officer KPA Unit 124. This special operation commando unit trained for two years and spent their final 15 days rehearsing action on the objective in a full-scale mockup of the Blue House.

These specially selected men were trained in infiltration and exfiltration techniques, weaponry, navigation, airborne operations, amphibious infiltration, hand-to-hand combat (with emphasis on knife fighting) and concealment.

Kim Shin-jo, one of only two known survivors, said "It made us fearless—no one would think to look for us in a graveyard." Their training was rigorous and often in adverse conditions, such as running at a speed of 13 km/h (8 mph) with 30 kg (66 pound) rucksacks over broken and unforgiving terrain, which sometimes resulted in injuries such as lost toes and feet from frostbite.

== Raid ==
=== Infiltration ===
On January 16, 1968, Unit 124 left their garrison at Yonsan. On January 17, 1968, at 23:00, they infiltrated the DMZ by cutting through the fencing of the United States Army's 2nd Infantry Division's sector, 3.5km southwest of Gorangpo. By 02:00 the next day they had set up camp at Morae-dong and Seokpo-ri. On January 19, at 05:00, after having crossed the Imjin River, they set up camp on Simbong Mountain.

At 14:00, four brothers named Woo from Beopwon-ri were out cutting firewood and stumbled across the unit's camp. After a fierce debate over whether to kill the brothers, it was decided instead to try to indoctrinate them on the benefits of communism and they were released with a stern warning not to notify the police. However, the brothers immediately reported the presence of the unit to the Changhyeon police station in Beopwon-ri.

The unit broke camp and increased their pace to more than 10 km/h (6 mph), carrying 30 kg (70 lb) of equipment each, crossing Nogo Mountain and arriving at Bibong Mountain on January 20 at 07:00. Three battalions from the Republic of Korea Army (ROKA) 25th Infantry Division began searching Nogo Mountain for the infiltrators, but they had already left the area. By then the commandos in the unit realized that South Korean security forces had been notified of their infiltration and changed their tactics accordingly. The unit entered Seoul in two- and three-man cells on the night of January 20 and regrouped at the Seungga-sa Temple, where they made their final preparations for the attack.

Meanwhile, the ROKA High Command added the 30th Infantry Division and Airborne Corps to the search and police began searching along Hongje-dong, Jeongreung, and Bugak Mountain. Given the increased security measures that had been implemented throughout the city and realizing their original plan had little chance of success, the team leader improvised a new plan.

Changing into ROKA uniforms of the local 26th Infantry Division, complete with the correct unit insignia (which they had brought with them), they formed up and prepared to march the last kilometre to the Blue House, posing as ROKA soldiers returning from a counter-infiltration patrol. The unit marched along Segeomjeong Road near Jahamun toward the Blue House, passing several National Police and ROKA units en route.

=== Conflict ===
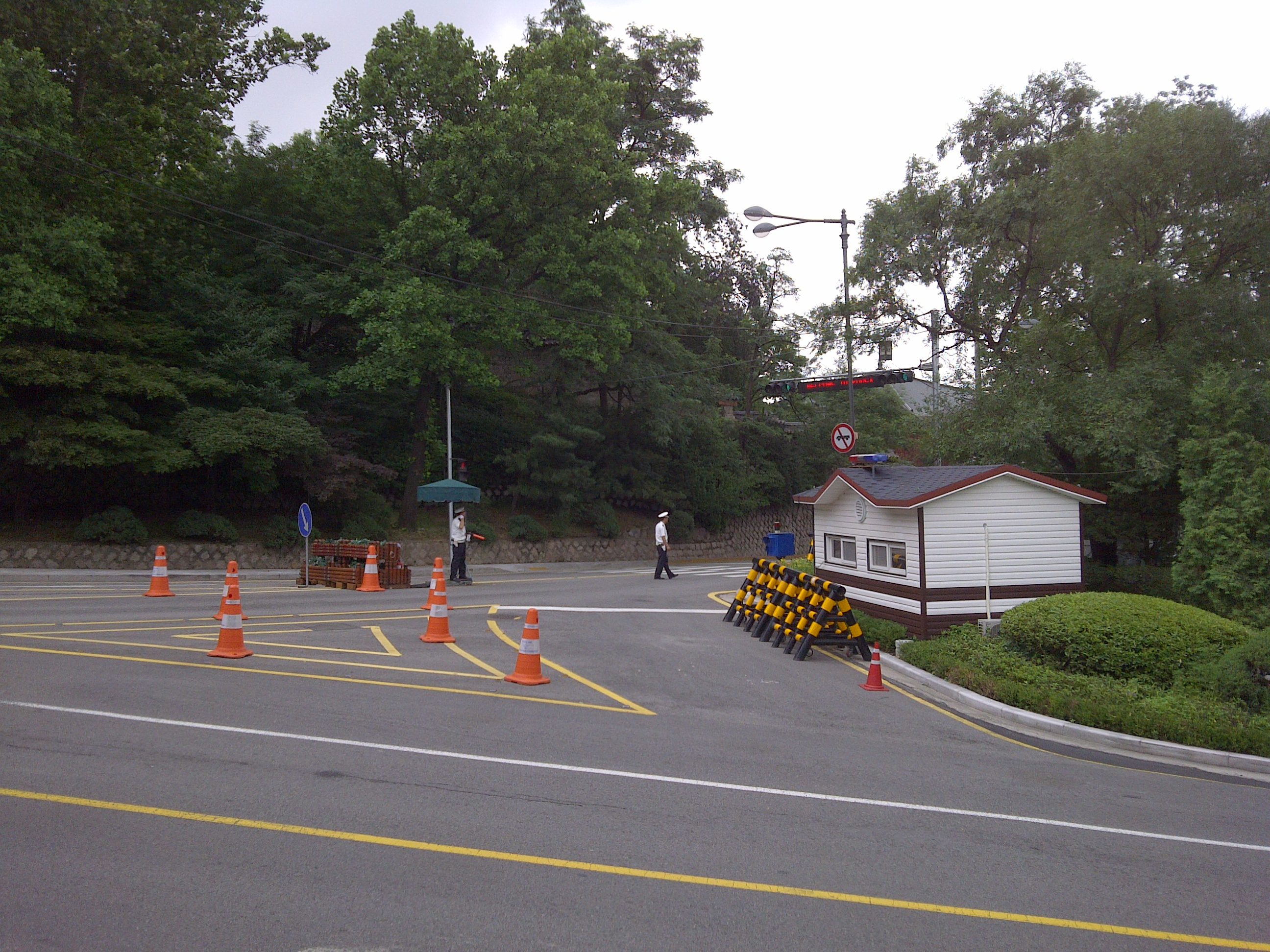
Segeomjeong-Jahamun checkpoint in July 2011 (since demolished)

At 22:00 on January 21, 1968, the unit approached the Segeomjeong–Jahamun checkpoint less than 100 meters from the Blue House, where Jongro police chief Choi Gyushik approached the unit and began to question them. When he grew suspicious of their answers, he drew his pistol and was shot by members of the unit who started firing and throwing grenades at the checkpoint. After several minutes of shooting, the unit dispersed, with some heading off to Inwangsan mountain, the Bibongsan mountain, and the city of Uijeongbu. Choi and Assistant Inspector Jung Jong-su were killed in the firefight; one commando was captured but managed to commit suicide.

On January 22, 1968, the ROKA's 6th Corps began a massive sweep operation to capture or kill any members of the unit. Soldiers from the 92nd Regiment, 30th Infantry Division captured Kim Shin-jo, who had been hiding in a civilian's house near Inwang Mountain. The 30th Battalion, Capital Defense Command, killed four commandos in Buam-dong and on Bugak Mountain.

On January 23, the 26th Infantry Division's Engineer Battalion killed one commando on Dobongsan. On January 24, 1968, the 26th Infantry Division and 1st Infantry Division soldiers killed 12 commandos near Seongu-ri. On January 25, three commandos were killed near Songchu. On January 29, six commandos were killed near Papyeong Mountain.

== Casualties ==
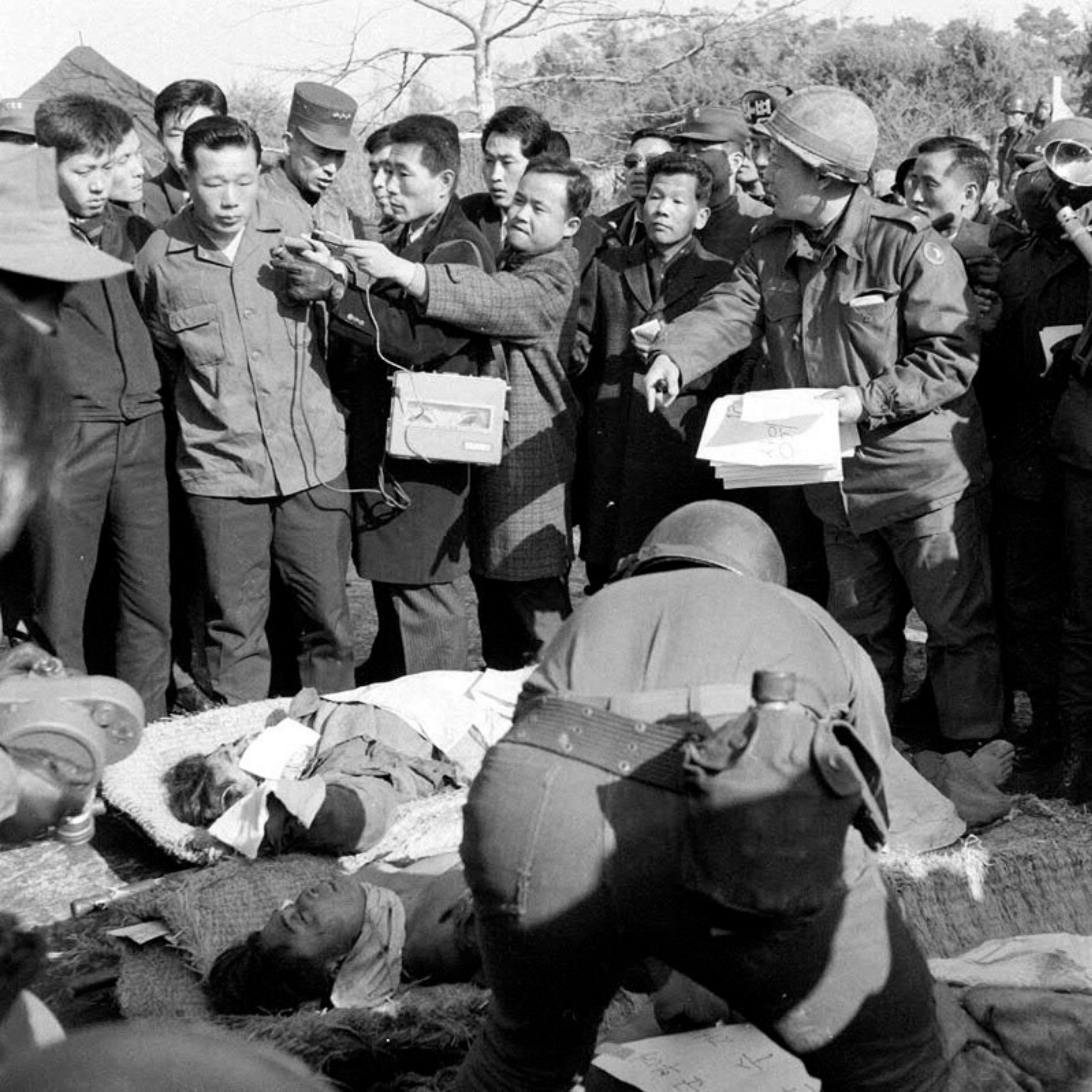
Kim Shin-jo is brought to identify the bodies of dead North Korean commandos

During the course of this assassination attempt, South Korean casualties totaled 26 killed and 66 wounded, including about 24 civilians. Four Americans also were killed in attempts to block the escaping infiltrators from crossing the DMZ. Of the 31 members of Unit 124, 29 were killed or committed suicide; one, Kim Shin-jo, was captured, and the other one, Pak Jae-gyong managed to escape back to North Korea. The bodies of the members of Unit 124 killed in the raid were later buried in the Cemetery for North Korean and Chinese Soldiers.

== Aftermath ==
On January 22, the United Nations Command (UNC) requested that a Military Armistice Commission (MAC) meeting be held to discuss the raid. The UNC requested the meeting for January 23, but the North Koreans asked for a day's delay. On January 23, the USS Pueblo, a technical research ship of the United States Navy, was captured by North Korea. Consequently, the MAC meeting held on January 24 had to deal not only with the raid but also with the Pueblo's capture. To a considerable extent, the seizure of the Pueblo diverted U.S. and international attention from the Blue House raid.

The Blue House raid occurred on the same day when the Battle of Khe Sanh started in Vietnam and on January 31 the Tet Offensive broke out across South Vietnam, making any U.S. support for South Korean retaliation unlikely. In Saigon, Viet Cong guerrillas attempted to assassinate President Nguyễn Văn Thiệu at the Independence Palace but were quickly beaten back. Some writers have suggested that due to the similarities of both attacks by a similar number of commandos (31 in Seoul and 34 in Saigon, respectively) that the North Korean leaders had a certain insight into Vietnamese Communist military operations, and wanted to take advantage of the Vietnam War. President Lyndon Johnson regarded the seizure of the Pueblo and the timing of the Tet Offensive to have been coordinated to divert U.S. resources away from Vietnam and to force the South Koreans to withdraw their two Divisions and Marine Brigade from South Vietnam. Unlike Johnson, UNC commander, General Charles H. Bonesteel III saw no such connection. He regarded the Blue House Raid as having been planned at the highest levels in North Korea, while the seizure of the Pueblo seemed merely opportunistic and the timing of the Tet Offensive as helpful but coincidental.

In response to the assassination attempt, the South Korean government organized the ill-fated Unit 684. This group was intended to assassinate the leader of North Korea, Kim Il Sung. However, following an improvement in intra-Korean relations, the unit's assassination mission was cancelled and in 1971 the unit revolted and most of its members were killed.

In May 1972, Kim Il Sung expressed regret and claimed that the Blue House raid "was entirely plotted by extreme leftists and did not reflect my intent or that of the Party" to the head of the Korean Central Intelligence Agency (KCIA) Lee Hu-rak during their meeting in Pyongyang.

Kim Shin-jo was later released after receiving a pardon for not opening fire during the raid. He settled in South Korea and started a family. He also became a critic of communism and said that his parents were later executed. He was ordained as a pastor in 1997 and died in 2025.

As part of the South Korean government’s efforts to promote "national security tourism" highlighting the dangers posed by North Korea, a diorama recreating the infiltration by the North Korean commando unit was installed on the edge of the DMZ in Yeoncheon County, at the exact spot where the infiltration is believed to have taken place. Located within a restricted-access military zone, it is open to visitors subject to certain security conditions.

== See also ==
- Assassination of Park Chung Hee
- Silmido (film)
- 209th Detachment, 2325th Group (Unit 684)
- Ulchin-Samcheok Landings
