= Korean DMZ Conflict =

1966–1969 North–South Korea conflict

- Part of the Korean conflict and the Cold War
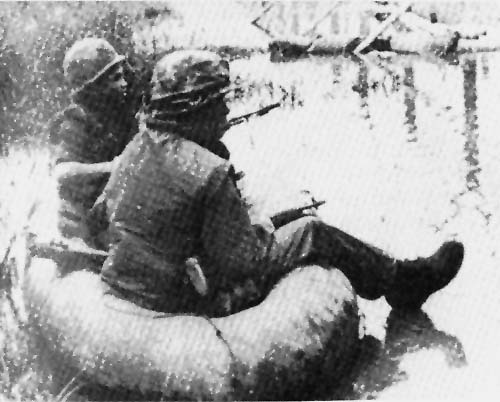
- American and South Korean soldiers at the DMZ, on 26 August 1967.
| Date | 5 October 1966 – 3 December 1969 (3 years, 1 month and 4 weeks) |
| Location | Korean Demilitarized Zone |
| Result | South Korean victory |
| Territorial changes | Status quo ante bellum |

Belligerents
| South Korea; United States | North Korea |

Commanders and leaders
| (Third Republic of Korea) Park Chung Hee; (United States) Lyndon B. Johnson; (United States) Richard Nixon; (United States) Robert McNamara; (United States) Clark Clifford; (United States) Melvin Laird; (United States) Charles H. Bonesteel III | (North Korea) Kim Il Sung (North Korea) Choe Kwang (North Korea) O Jin-u |

Casualties and losses
| South Korea: 299 killed 550 wounded 1 patrol craft sunk United States: 81 killed 120 wounded 85 captured and later released 2 jeeps destroyed 2 aircraft 1 technical research vessel captured | 397 killed At least 23 wounded 33 defected 12 soldiers and 2,462 agents captured |
- (Third Republic of Korea) 47 South Korean civilians killed

The Korean DMZ Conflict, also known as the Second Korean War, was a series of armed clashes between North Korea and South Korea, supported by the United States, along the Korean Demilitarized Zone (DMZ) between 1966 and 1969.

== Background ==
The Korean War had devastated both North and South Korea, and while neither side renounced its claims to reunify Korea under its control, neither side was in a position to force reunification.

In September 1956, Chairman of the Joint Chiefs of Staff Admiral Radford indicated within the U.S. government that the military's intention was to introduce atomic weapons into Korea, which was agreed to by the United States National Security Council and President Eisenhower. However paragraph 13(d) of the Korean Armistice Agreement mandated that both sides could not introduce new types of weapons into Korea, thus preventing the introduction of nuclear weapons and missiles. The U.S. decided to unilaterally abrogate paragraph 13(d), breaking the Armistice Agreement, despite concerns by United Nations allies. At a 21 June 1957 meeting of the Military Armistice Commission, the U.S. informed the North Korean representatives that the U.N. Command no longer considered itself bound by paragraph 13(d) of the armistice. In January 1958, nuclear-armed Honest John missiles and 280mm atomic cannons were deployed to South Korea, followed within a year by atomic demolition munitions and nuclear-armed Matador cruise missiles capable of reaching China and the Soviet Union.

North Korea denounced the abrogation of paragraph 13(d) as an attempt to wreck the armistice agreement and turn Korea into a U.S. atomic warfare zone. It responded by digging massive underground fortifications resistant to nuclear attack, and forward deployment of its conventional forces so that the use of nuclear weapons against it would endanger South Korean and U.S. forces as well. In 1963, North Korea asked the Soviet Union for help in developing nuclear weapons, but the Soviets refused. China later, after its own nuclear tests, also rejected North Korean requests for help.

In North Korea, the departure of the Chinese People's Liberation Army in October 1958 allowed Kim Il Sung to consolidate his power base and embark on the Chollima Movement of collectivised agriculture and industrialization to build a base for reunifying Korea by force. North Korea remained dependent on the Soviet Union for technology and on China for agricultural assistance.

Following the war, South Korea remained one of the poorest countries in the world for over a decade. In 1960, its gross domestic product per capita was $79, lower than most Latin American and some sub-Saharan African countries. The April Revolution that forced President Syngman Rhee from office in April 1960 was followed by a brief period of democracy before a coup d'état led to General Park Chung Hee seizing power in May 1961. Despite the political turmoil, the South Korean economy continued to grow, led by the industrial sector. Rapid industrial growth started in the late 1960s, with gross domestic product per capita rising from $100 in 1964 to $1000 in 1977.

On 10 December 1962, Kim proposed a new military strategy to the Central Committee of the Workers' Party of Korea, with an increased emphasis on irregular warfare, agitation and propaganda, to be achieved by the end of the current Seven-Year Plan in 1967.

In June 1965, President Park signed a treaty normalizing relations with Japan, which included payment of reparations and the making of soft loans from Japan and led to increased trade and investment between the two countries. In July 1966, South Korea and the United States signed a Status of Forces Agreement, establishing a more equal relationship between the two nations. With its growing economic strength and the security guarantee of the United States, the threat of a conventional invasion from the north seemed increasingly remote. Following the escalation of the Vietnam War with the deployment of ground combat troops in March 1965, South Korea sent the Capital Division and the 2nd Marine Brigade to South Vietnam in September 1965, followed by the White Horse Division in September 1966.

The start of the DMZ Conflict can be traced to a speech given by North Korean leader Kim Il Sung on 5 October 1966, at the Workers' Party of Korea Conference, where the status quo of the 1953 Armistice Agreement was challenged. He apparently perceived that the division of effort by the South Korean military and the ever-growing escalation of the US commitment in Vietnam had created an environment where irregular warfare could succeed in a way conventional warfare could not. Kim believed that he could force a split between the U.S. and South Korea through armed provocations targeting U.S. forces that, together with other worldwide commitments and small wars, would force the U.S. to reassess or relinquish its commitment to South Korea, allowing North Korea to incite an insurgency in the South that would topple the Park administration.

There were ongoing propaganda campaigns between the north and south, such as loudspeaker broadcasts across the DMZ at each other. Leafleting of North Korea had been resumed, such as Operation Jilli from 1964 to 1968 which delivered a few hundred million leaflets to the north.

== Military forces ==
=== North Korea ===
In 1966, the Korean People's Army (KPA) deployed eight infantry divisions along the DMZ, backed by eight more infantry divisions, three motorized infantry divisions, a tank division and a collection of separate infantry and tank brigades and regiments. Its total armed forced personnel numbered 386,000. While strong, this conventional force was smaller than the South's ground forces of about 585,000, and it was unlikely that the North could deliver a knockout blow before the U.S. could deploy additional forces.

The main unconventional warfare arm was the Reconnaissance Bureau of the Ministry of Defense under the operational control of the Liaison Department of the Workers' Party of Korea which included the 17th Foot Reconnaissance Brigade and the all-officer Unit 124 and 283rd Army Units. These units were all highly trained and indoctrinated, skilled in demolitions and small-unit tactics, they would usually operate in small teams of 2–12 men, lightly armed with either PPS submachine guns or AK-47s. The Reconnaissance Bureau also controlled the 23d Amphibious Brigade, which used specially made infiltration boats to operate along the South Korean coastline. The Reconnaissance Bureau could also use conventional KPA and Korean People's Navy forces to support the infiltration and exfiltration of its teams.

In addition to the offensive irregular forces, North Korea also deployed several thousand operator-agitators to select, train, and supervise informants and guerrilla recruits, while others attempted to cause individual defections and unit dissatisfaction in the ROK military and generally undermine the morale of both the ROKs and the Americans.

=== United States and South Korea ===
The major U.S. ground combat units in Korea were the 2nd Infantry Division (2ID) and 7th Infantry Division (7ID), I Corps and 8th Army. 2ID stood with the 3rd Brigade manning 29.8 km of the Korean Demilitarized Zone (DMZ) essentially due north of Seoul on either side of Panmunjom, with another nine Republic of Korea Army (ROK) Divisions manning the remaining 212.8 km of the DMZ. All U.S. and ROKA forces were under the unified operational control of United Nations Command (Korea) (who was also the commander United States Forces Korea), General Charles H. Bonesteel III. Both U.S. Army Divisions were seriously under strength as Vietnam had priority for manpower and equipment. Troops were equipped with M14 rifles rather than M16s, the only available tanks were older gasoline powered M48A2Cs, and there were a total of only 12 UH-1 Huey helicopters in South Korea seriously restricting the ability to hunt and engage infiltrators. Troops were generally draftees serving a 13-month tour, while experienced officers and NCOs preferred service in Vietnam to Korea. The ROK Divisions were well trained and highly motivated with many of the officers and NCOs veterans of the Korean War, but all their equipment dated back to that war; their standard rifle was still the M1 Garand.

The main operational objective of the US and ROK Divisions was to defend against a conventional invasion from North Korea in a repeat of the attack of June 1950. While there were regular infiltrations into the South for intelligence-gathering, unconventional warfare was not seen as a particular threat and the troops were not generally trained or equipped for this role. No counter-guerilla units or village militias existed in South Korea in 1966 and infiltrators were variously hunted by the ROK Army, Police and the Korean Central Intelligence Agency with no unified control.

In 1976, in now-declassified meeting minutes, U.S. Deputy Secretary of Defense William Clements told Henry Kissinger that there had been 200 raids or incursions into North Korea from the south, though not by the U.S. military. Details of only a few of these incursions have become public, including raids by South Korean forces in 1967 that had sabotaged about 50 North Korean facilities. Up to 7,700 South Korean soldiers and agents infiltrated North Korea from the end of the Korean war until 1972, an estimated 5,300 of whom never made it back.

The ground forces were supported by fighter-bombers of the USAF 314th Air Division and by the Republic of Korea Air Force. The seas around Korea were under the control of the United States Seventh Fleet and the Republic of Korea Navy. As with the Army, the war in Vietnam was the main focus of the USAF and the USN in the Pacific.

== Defense strategies ==
From October 1964 the North Koreans increased the infiltration of intelligence-gatherers and propagandists into the South. By October 1966, more than 30 South Korean soldiers and at least 10 civilians had been killed in clashes with North Korean infiltrators; however, no similar clashes had taken place along the U.S.-controlled section of the DMZ. In October 1966, South Korea staged a retaliatory attack without seeking the approval of General Bonesteel, causing tension between the U.S. command, which wished to avoid violations of the armistice, and the South Koreans, who were suffering ongoing losses.

Following the first KPA attack on US forces in November 1966, Bonesteel formed a working group to analyse the North Korean strategy and develop a counter-strategy to defeat it. Finding the existing U.S. Army tactical doctrines to be inapplicable to the situation they were facing, the working group developed its own doctrine to meet its operational needs. Three types of operations were identified: first to guard against infiltration across the DMZ; second was a similar naval effort along the coasts; and third was counterguerrilla operations in the interior. All three types of operations had to be accomplished without jeopardizing the conventional defense of South Korea or escalating the conflict from low-intensity to a full war.

=== Demilitarized Zone ===
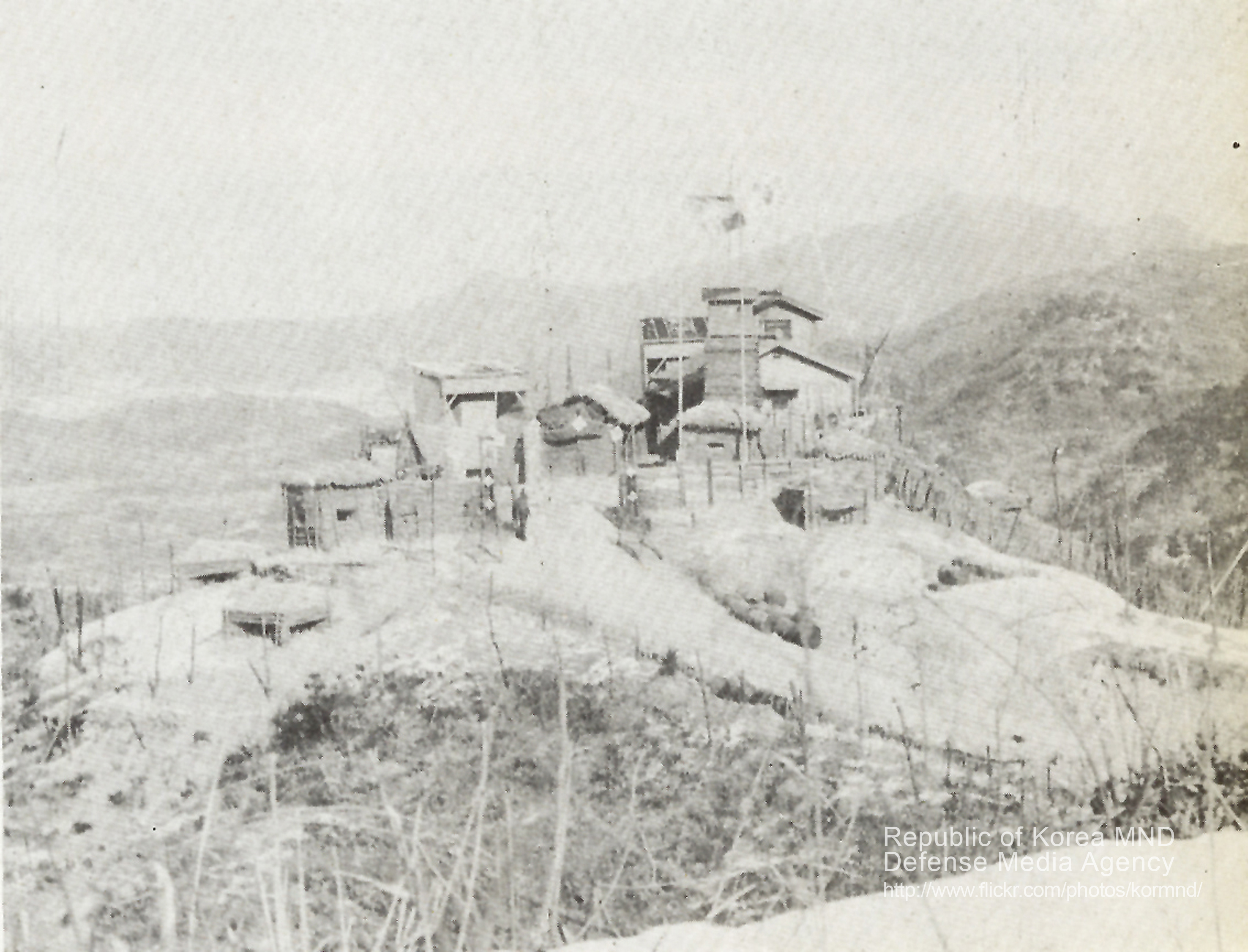
A South Korean DMZ Guard Post

Starting in 1967 the UN Command developed a layered defense of the Korean Demilitarized Zone (DMZ). The Armistice restricted fortification within the DMZ, where defences were limited to patrols and observation posts without heavy weapons. More aggressive patrolling of the DMZ was ordered with patrols going out for 24 hours, reconnoitering by day and establishing ambushes at night; most U.S. casualties occurred during these patrols. The observation posts were fortified with sandbags and machine-guns and recoilless rifles were frequently kept hidden there in breach of the Armistice. Bonesteel obtained $30m in funding from the U.S. Army Combat Developments Command to create a DMZ test barrier along the portion of the DMZ occupied by the 2ID and the ROKA 21st Infantry Division. Beyond the southern boundary or "south tape" of the DMZ, no defensive restrictions applied and a combined U.S.–Korean engineer force constructed an in-depth Barrier comprising a 3m tall chain-link fence, topped by triple strands of concertina wire and reinforced by interwoven saplings and steel engineer pickets, behind it a narrow, raked-sand path paralleled the fence to highlight footprints.

Behind the sand strip was a 120m wide cleared kill zone in which mines and tanglefoot wire fronted a line of conventional defensive positions of interlocking machine guns and pre-registered mortar and artillery fire which dominated the kill zone. Observation towers stood at intervals along the trace to permit clear view of the open areas. Various electronics and sensors were tested on the Barrier similar to the McNamara Line in Vietnam, but with the exception of Starlight scopes they were largely ineffective. The Barrier could not prevent infiltration (it was estimated that the North Koreans could cut through the fence in 30–40 seconds), rather it was intended to slow movement and provide easy observation.

Behind the Barrier were the quick-reaction forces of mechanized infantry, tanks and armored cavalry that would hunt down infiltrators. The rules of engagement were also loosened to allow the frontline troops to use artillery and mortar fire against known KPA elements in or south of the DMZ and against KPA firing from north of the Military Demarcation Line, although in practice this was only used sparingly. A new four monthly rotation scheme was introduced in October 1967 to ensure that each Battalion received only its fair share of time manning and patrolling the Barrier. 7ID sent one infantry battalion at a time to augment the 3rd Brigade, 2ID, this increased the defense to four Battalions on the line plus the quick-reaction forces.

South Korea launched at least three retaliatory cross-border raids in late 1967 using small teams of North Korean defectors. The raids killed 33 KPA soldiers.

=== Korean coastline ===
Preventing infiltration at sea created an impossible challenge for the UN Command, which lacked suitable aircraft, ships, radar and communications. The ROK Navy possessed only 72 vessels to patrol over 7,000 kilometers of rugged coastline. Along the coasts, some 20,000 unarmed coastwatchers, sometimes supplemented by ROKA reservists, patrolled the beaches and when signs of landings were discovered these would be reported to the National Police and quick reaction forces would be deployed. Poor communications and a lack of helicopters meant that the quick reaction forces seldom arrived in time before the infiltrators dispersed in the Korean hinterland.

=== Counterinsurgency operations ===
During 1966 and into 1967, there was no coordinated counterinsurgency plan in South Korea. Infiltrations were dealt with on an ad hoc basis by the ROKA, National Police, Army counter-intelligence units and the KCIA usually depending on the estimate of the threat and whichever units happened to be nearby. Park was reluctant to raise and arm a civilian militia as he did not fully trust the loyalty of the populace to his government.

Bonesteel regarded counterinsurgency as entirely an internal responsibility for the South Korean Government. While he provided some material support including his helicopters and several Special Forces A-Teams from the 1st Special Forces Group on Okinawa to train the ROKA and the newly formed Combat Police in counterinsurgency tactics, he declined to take responsibility for counterinsurgency operations.

By late 1967 it was clear that the North Koreans were attempting to develop a full-scale insurgency in the South with strongholds in the Taebaek Mountains and around Jirisan mountain. Park in consultation with Bonesteel, developed a counterinsurgency strategy in the form of Presidential Instruction #18. The instruction established a national coordinating council with clear chains of command for all classes of incidents ranging from individual agent sightings to province-level unrest. Eight (later ten) new ROKA counter-infiltration battalions were to be formed, together with further expansion of the Combat Police.

== January 1968 ==
=== The Blue House Raid ===
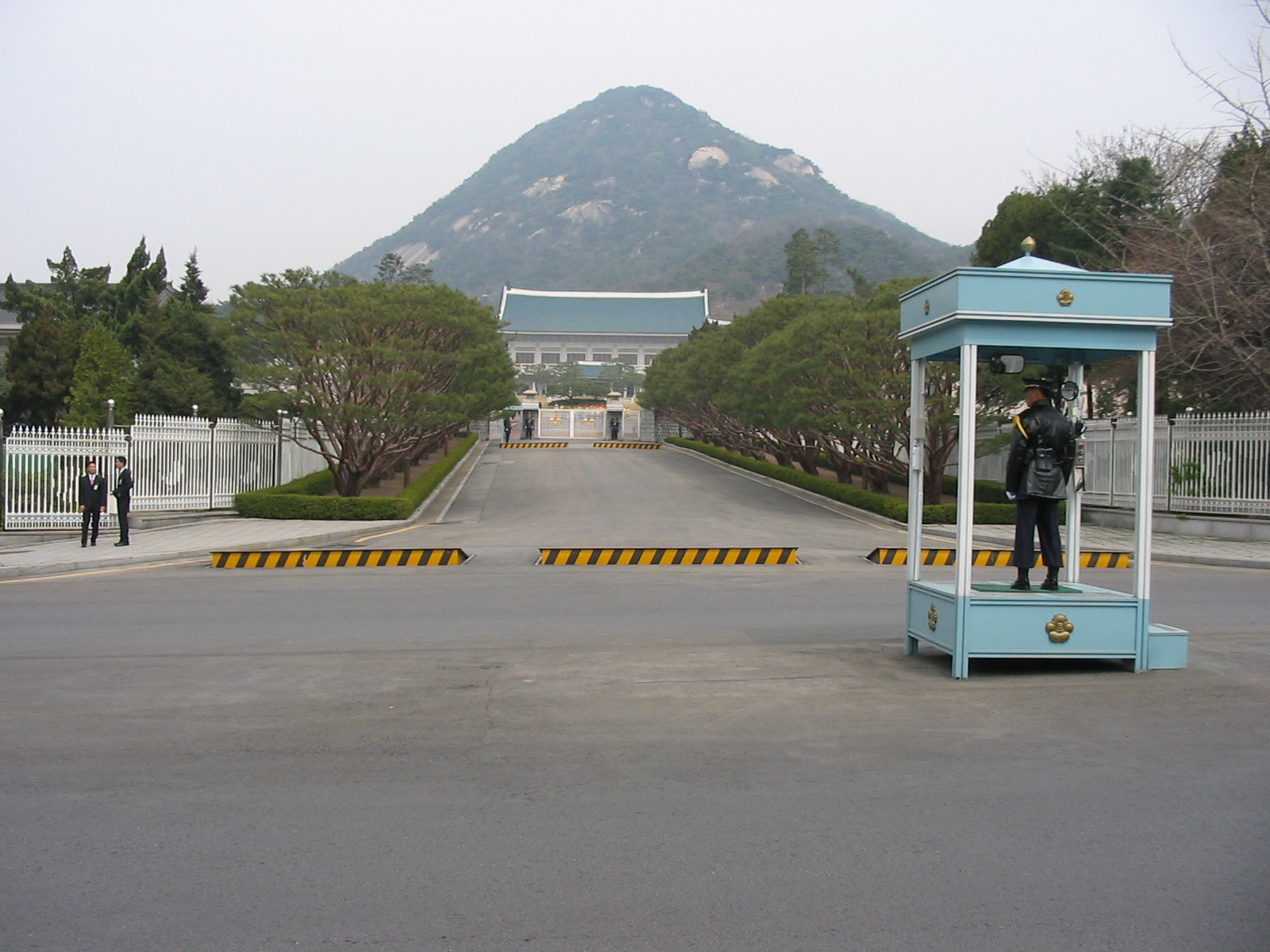
The Blue House complex in Seoul, South Korea, in April 2007. It served as the executive office and official residence of the South Korean president.

On the night of 17 January 1968, 31 men of Unit 124 penetrated the 2ID sector of the DMZ by cutting through the chain-link fence and passing undetected within 30m of a manned 2ID position. The mission of Unit 124, as explained to them by KPA Reconnaissance Bureau chief, Lieutenant General Kim Chung-tae, was "to go to Seoul and cut off the head of Park Chung Hee". It was believed that by assassinating Park, the South would be thrown into turmoil, causing the South Korean populace to rise up and fight against the South Korean government and American soldiers, leading to reunification.

On the afternoon of 19 January Unit 124 encountered four woodcutters, but rather than killing them the Unit 124 commander proceeded to try to indoctrinate them with details of the coming insurrection and the glories of North Korean communism. The North Koreans released the woodcutters with warnings not to notify the authorities. The woodcutters notified the police as soon as possible, and an alert went up the chain of command in accordance with Presidential Instruction #18. By the morning of 20 January the police and military were on full alert, but not knowing the mission of Unit 124 they were attempting to guard important sites as well as the approaches to Seoul.

Unit 124 entered Seoul in 2–3-man cells on 20 January, and noting the heightened security and by eavesdropping of ROKA radio frequencies they devised a new assault plan. Changing into uniforms of the 26th Infantry Division they proceeded to march the last 2 km to the Blue House, posing as a unit returning from a counter-guerilla patrol. After passing several ROKA and police units, Unit 124 was stopped by a police unit only 100m from the Blue House. The police began questioning the Unit 124 members and when a police officer grew suspicious and drew his pistol he was shot by a Unit 124 member.

A running gun battle then developed in which two members of Unit 124 were killed. The ROKA, police and U.S. Army began a massive manhunt as the remaining members of Unit 124 attempted to escape north and cross the DMZ. A further 26 members of Unit 124 were killed, one captured (Kim Shin-Jo) and two missing presumed killed (though at least one member of the Unit apparently survived and returned to North Korea) while 26 South Koreans and four U.S. Army soldiers were killed.

=== The Pueblo Incident ===
On 23 January 1968 North Korean patrol boats operating under cover of MiG-21 fighters captured the USS Pueblo (AGER-2) in international waters northeast of Wonsan, killing one crewman. Bonesteel was unaware of the mission of the Pueblo and the 314th Air Division had no suitable aircraft available to give assistance to the Pueblo. By the time that attack aircraft could be sent to the area, the Pueblo and her remaining 82 crewmen were in captivity in Wonsan harbour.

=== American-South Korean reactions ===
Video on the clashes in 1969

The seizure of the Pueblo was one of a number of crises facing the Johnson Administration in January 1968: in Vietnam, the Battle of Khe Sanh had commenced on 21 January. President Johnson ordered a show of force with a massive deployment of U.S. air and navy assets to Korea under the code-names Operation Combat Fox (200+ combat aircraft) and Operation Formation Star (six aircraft carriers plus support vessels) as well as the partial mobilization of reservists for the first time since the Cuban Missile Crisis.

Despite this military buildup, Johnson wished to avoid escalating the existing conflict in Korea and instructed Bonesteel to begin negotiations for the return of the Pueblo crew with the North Koreans through the Military Armistice Commission at Panmunjom. Even as the extra forces were deploying to South Korea, the Tet Offensive in South Vietnam began on 30 January 1968. Johnson regarded the seizure of the Pueblo and the timing of the Tet Offensive to have been coordinated to divert U.S. resources away from Vietnam and to force the South Koreans to withdraw their two Divisions and Marine Brigade from South Vietnam.

Unlike Johnson, Bonesteel saw no such connection. He regarded the Blue House Raid as having been planned at the highest levels in North Korea, while the seizure of the Pueblo seemed merely opportunistic and the timing of the Tet Offensive as helpful but coincidental. He saw no change to his mission of defending South Korea and preventing an escalation of the existing low-intensity conflict.

The South Koreans saw things differently. They regarded the Blue House Raid and the seizure of the Pueblo as signs of a North Korean threat that had to be dealt with strongly by both the ROK and the U.S. When news of negotiations between the U.S. and North Koreans at Panmunjom became public on 6 February, the Park Administration accused the U.S. of a policy of appeasement. Newspaper editorials and Government officials suggested that the Korean units in South Vietnam should be recalled to deal with the North Korean threat, while various advisers coaxed Park to "go North" with or without the Americans. Park refused to negotiate seriously with either Bonesteel or Ambassador William J. Porter. It appeared that the split that Kim Il Sung hoped to create between the ROK and the U.S. was becoming a reality.

On 10 February Cyrus Vance arrived in Seoul to negotiate with Park on behalf of Johnson. Vance met with Park on 11 February and set out the Johnson Administration's position: there would be no wider war in Korea, any ROK cross-border action was subject to approval by Bonesteel who would himself need approval from Johnson and the U.S. would negotiate as necessary to secure the release of the Pueblo crew. Vance offered Park $100M in immediate military aid (including F-4D Phantom II fighter jets) with more to follow, provided Park agreed not to "go North." Four days later Park agreed to Vance's terms.

== Implementing the American and South Korean strategy ==
The Blue House Raid and the Pueblo Incident both served to raise the profile of the low-intensity conflict being fought in South Korea and finally brought in the resources needed to fully implement the joint U.S./ROK counterinsurgency strategy.

The massive surge deployment of U.S. warships and combat aircraft in operations Formation Star and Combat Fox served to deter further large-scale incursions. Once the immediate threat subsided, the U.S. Seventh Fleet withdrew its ships by mid-1968, while the U.S. Air Force gradually reduced its Combat Fox deployment over a period of 16 months.

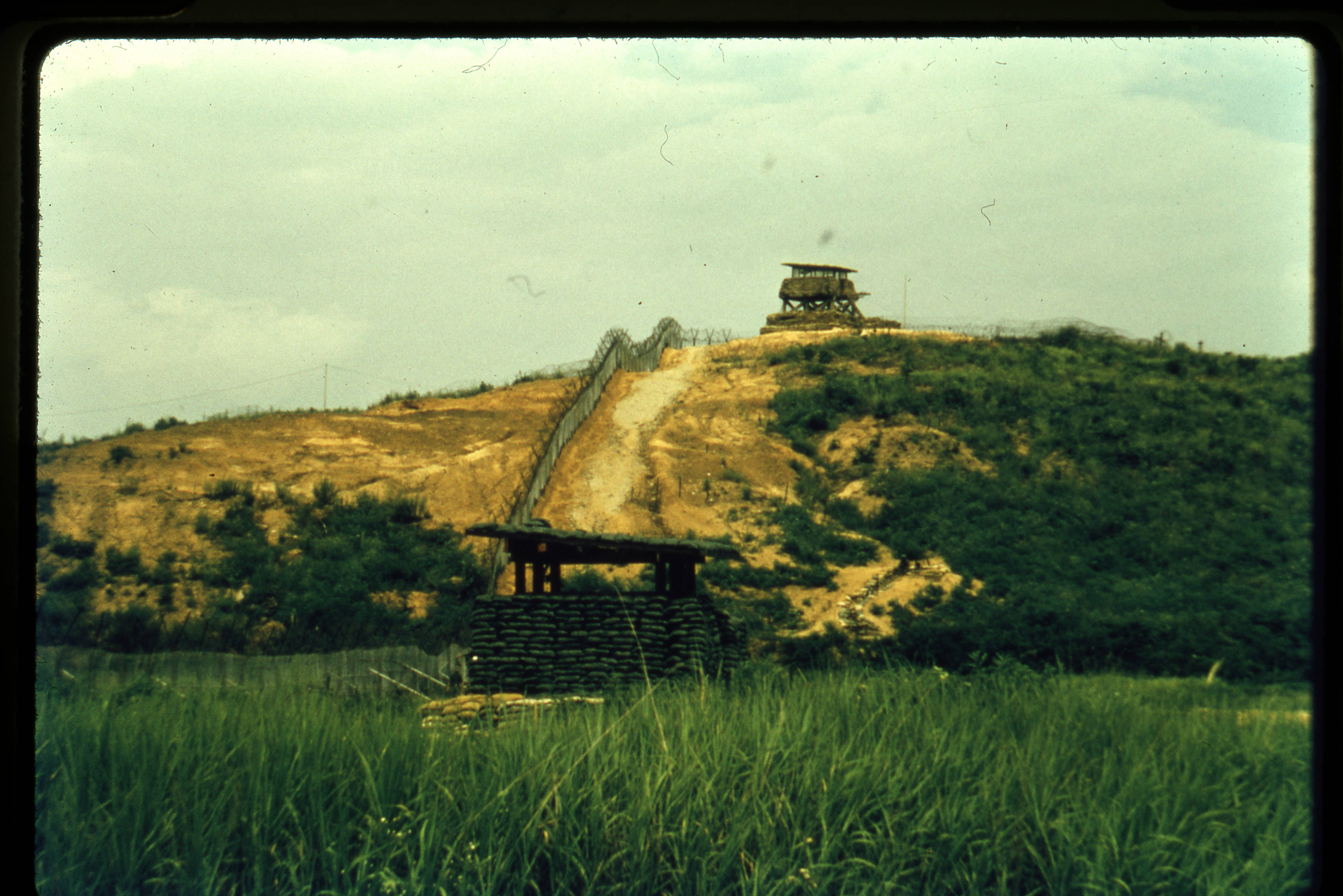
DMZ south boundary fence and guard towers, 14 August 1968

On 1 April 1968, the Department of Defense on Bonesteel's recommendation declared the DMZ-Imjin River area as a hostile fire zone, entitling service members stationed in the area to hostile-fire pay and later for the award of the Combat Infantryman Badge and Combat Medical Badge to all qualified men serving north of the Imjin River. This change in designation also meant that Korea would now receive priority second only to South Vietnam. In addition to the $100M promised to the ROK by envoy Vance, Congress also allocated $230M to improve U.S. and ROK facilities and combat readiness across the DMZ. $32M worth of material for the construction of the DMZ barrier and communications equipment was airlifted to South Korea, allowing the completion of the improved anti-infiltration barrier along the entire DMZ by 30 July 1968. The 6th Aviation Platoon which was en route to South Vietnam was instead deployed to South Korea, with its 12 UH-1D Hueys more than doubled the number of UH-1s available, allowing some to remain on alert with quick reaction forces while others conducted counter-infiltration operations. Several thousand additional enlisted men were allocated to Eighth Army alleviating manpower shortages while the Imjin Scouts programme improved training in counterinfiltration tactics. Dog-tracker teams were deployed allowing improved detection of infiltrators, while several hundred M16 rifles were procured allowing patrols to match the firepower of KPA infiltrators. These improvements taken together resulted in a dramatic increase in the detection and elimination of KPA infiltrators in 1968.

The Blue House Raid convinced Park to make one crucial change to Presidential Directive #18, in February 1968 he ordered the creation of the Homeland Defense Reserve Force (HDRF), publicly announced in April, within six months more than two million South Korean citizens had volunteered, forming more than 60,000 local defense platoons and companies. Park also ordered the establishment of 20 Reconstruction Villages just south of the DMZ, populated by armed ex-soldiers and their families and the dispatch of ROKA civic action Medical/Enlightenment Teams into remote areas, particularly in the Taebaek and Jiri Mountain areas.

== Ulchin-Samcheok landings ==
While the DMZ became increasingly difficult to penetrate during 1968, South Korea's coastline, despite some improvements in ROK Navy capabilities, remained vulnerable to infiltration.

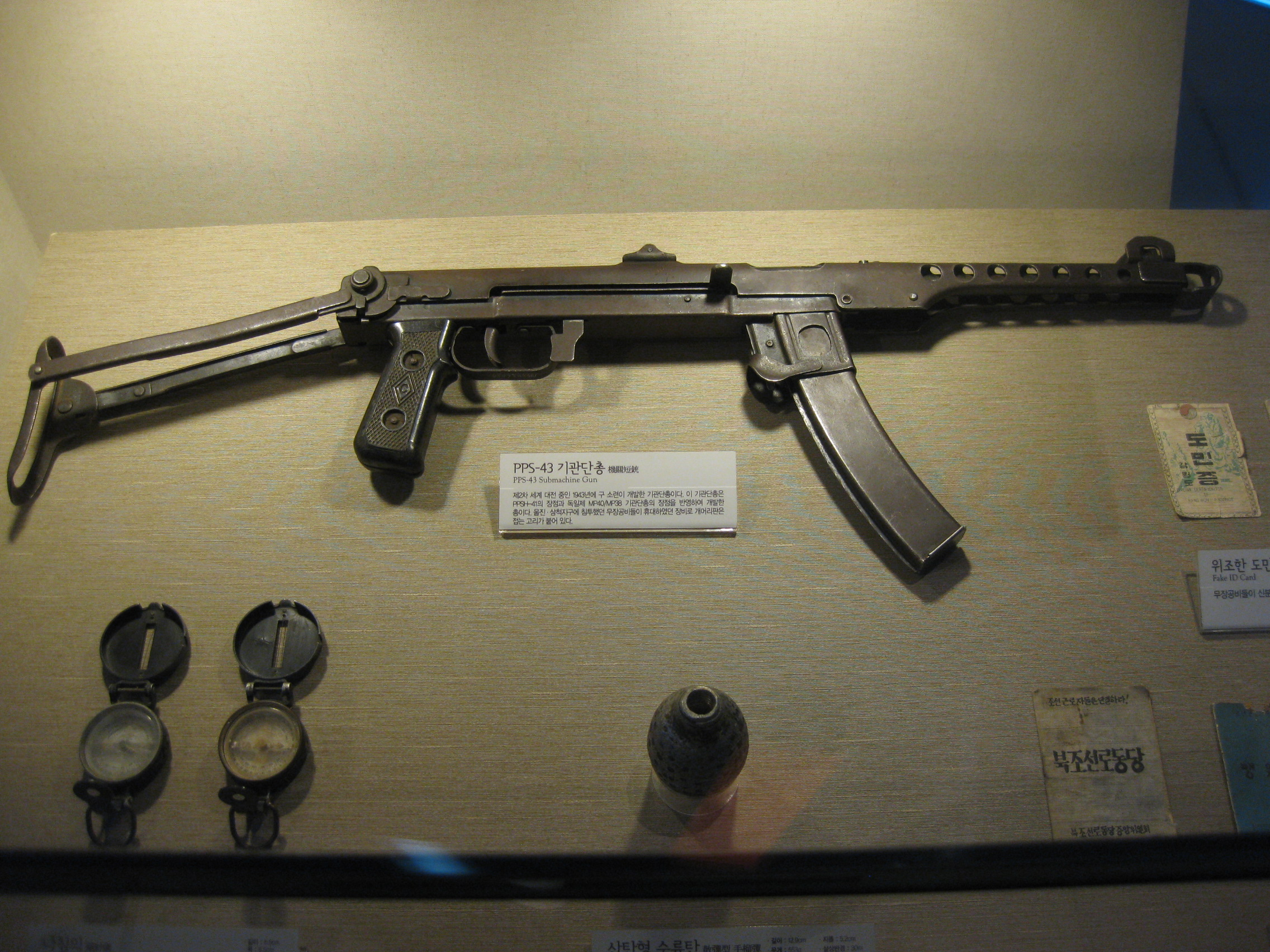
PPS-43, compasses, grenade and fake ID from the Ulchin-Samcheok Landings at the War Memorial of Korea

On the night of 30 October 1968, 120 men of Unit 124 landed at eight separate locations between Ulchin and Samcheok in Gangwon Province and moved inland on a 30-day mission to create guerilla bases in the Taebaek Mountains. On the morning of 31 October they entered several villages and began indoctrinating the villagers, several of whom slipped away to alert the authorities. ROKA forces soon arrived in the area aboard the UH-1 Hueys of the 6th Aviation Platoon and some of the new UH-1s provided to the ROKA under the Military Assistance Program. The 36th Homeland Defense Infantry Division, parts of two other Divisions, an ROK Marine Corps battalion, Combat Police companies, an ROK Special Forces Group and thousands of Home Defense Reserves took part in the manhunt that followed. Within two weeks most of the infiltrators had been killed. On 9 December several commandos murdered 9-year-old Lee Seung-bok and three other members of his family at their home on the remote northern slope of Gyebangsan. By the time Park suspended the operation on 26 December 110 North Koreans had been killed and seven captured, for the loss of 40 regular army, police and militia and 23 civilians.

== North Korean strategy changes ==
By the end of 1968 it was apparent that despite two years of unconventional operations, North Korea had failed to ignite an insurgency in the South, the U.S.–ROK relationship was stronger than ever and Park had cemented his legitimacy with the population. In late December Kim Il Sung purged the senior military officers responsible for the unconventional warfare campaign accusing them of failing to correctly implement the Party line; there could be no suggestion that the KWP line simply did not appeal to South Koreans. Defense Minister, General Kim Chongbong and KPA Political Bureau chairman, General Ho Pong-haek were both executed, while the chief of the General Staff, the Reconnaissance Bureau chief, the KPN commander and the commanders of three frontline KPA Corps were all imprisoned. Units 124 and 283 were disbanded and special warfare capabilities were made explicitly subordinate to conventional military operations. The KPA was transformed by the institution of a Commissar system in all units down to Company level to ensure KWP control over all military activity. Despite the change in strategy North Korea continued to conduct infiltrations, apparently as cover while the purge and restructuring was carried out.

The UN Command did not initially appreciate the changes in Pyongyang, regarding the reduction in infiltrations as being caused by effective UN action rather than the abandonment by Pyongyang of its failed strategy; limited intelligence sources and few published speeches by Kim Il Sung gave few clues as to the KWP's policy change. In mid-March the combined forces Exercise Focus Retina began in South Korea, this exercise was condemned by the North as a dress rehearsal for an invasion and KPA regulars began a series of attacks and infiltrations against 2ID position on the DMZ that lasted until mid-May.

On 15 April 1969 (the birthday of Kim Il Sung), two KPAF MiGs shot down a USAF EC-121M Warning Star on an electronic intelligence mission 167 km off the east coast of North Korea, killing all 31 crewmen. President Richard Nixon and National Security Advisor Henry Kissinger considered a reprisal air strike or an aerial escort linked to a diplomatic complaint at the truce table, both initially favored an air strike on the basis that force should be met with force. Nixon's advisers opposed an airstrike, fearing that this could provoke a full-scale war when the U.S. was already committed in Vietnam and they were supported in this by Bonesteel and Ambassador Porter. On 18 April Nixon announced that future intelligence flights would have fighter escorts (which had been the case until the end of 1968 when the tensions on the Korean peninsula were believed to have subsided) and a protest was lodged with the North Koreans at Panmunjom which was accepted without comment. From 19 to 26 April the Seventh Fleet's Task Force 71 (including 4 carriers and their escorts) conducted operations off the east coast of North Korea as a show of force.

== Conflict diffusion and aftermath ==
By May 1969, the level of intensity of the conflict had reduced substantially. Isolated incidents continued to occur particularly along the ROKA-controlled sectors of the DMZ, but it had become clear that the North had abandoned its hopes of starting an insurgency in the South. Qualitative improvements in the ROK Army meant that the U.S. could start to contemplate reducing its military presence in South Korea. On 25 July 1969, Nixon announced his Nixon Doctrine that, henceforth, the U.S. expected its allies to defend themselves with U.S. air and seapower support (and the nuclear umbrella), but not U.S. ground troops.

While aimed primarily at South Vietnam, this policy would also apply to South Korea (however, Nixon assured Park that his commitment to South Korea was unchanged). On 1 October 1969 Bonesteel handed over command of USFK to General John H. Michaelis. One of Michaelis' early tasks was negotiating the release of three U.S. soldiers captured when their OH-23 helicopter was shot down after straying across the DMZ; their release on 3 December 1969 is regarded as the official end of the conflict.

Although North Korea celebrated the DMZ Conflict as a "second front" in the Vietnam War, it had not been coordinated with the Viet Cong; in fact, Ho Chi Minh was frustrated about the North Korean offensive as it merely diverted attention from Vietnam. Several other socialist figureheads, including Leonid Brezhnev, criticized the North Koreans for engaging in escalation as the DMZ Conflict could lead the Park regime to further clamp down on opposition and to intensify its military collaboration with the US.

== Timeline ==
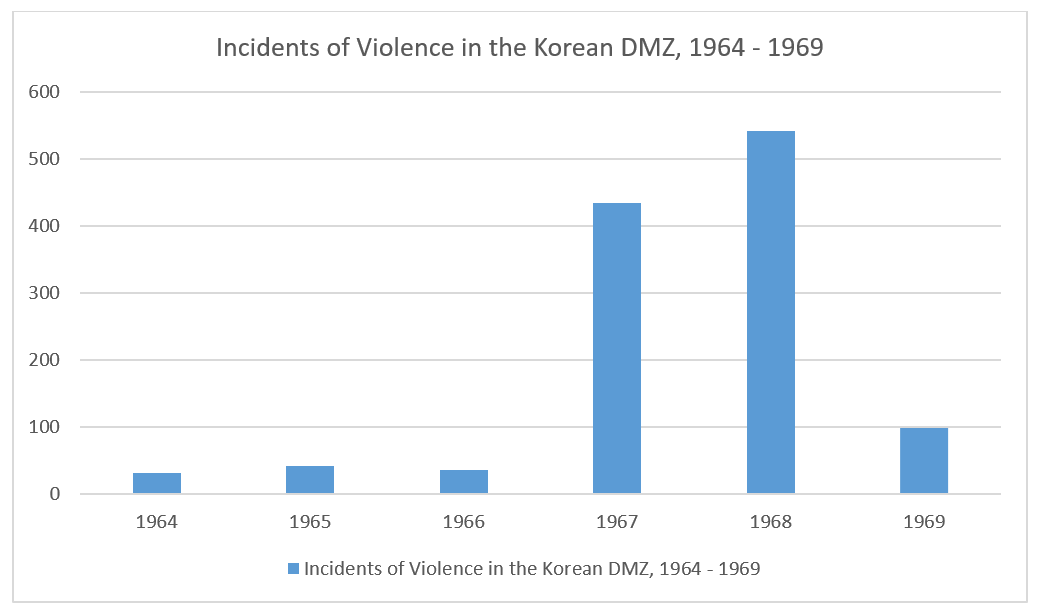
Major incidents – Korean DMZ, 1964–1969

=== 1966 ===
- 2 November: 2nd Infantry Division (2ID) patrol (1st Battalion, 23rd Infantry Regiment) ambushed south of DMZ. Six U.S. KIA, one KATUSA KIA, one U.S. WIA; unknown KPA losses. Private Ernest Reynolds was posthumously awarded the Silver Star for his actions during the ambush. An ROKA patrol was ambushed the same night. Two ROK KIA.

=== 1967 ===
- 19 January: The ROKS Dangpo (PCEC 56) (formerly the USS Marfa (PCE-842)), was sunk by North Korean coastal artillery north of the maritime demarcation line off the east coast of Korea, 39 sailors of the crew of 79 are killed.
- 12 February: 2ID patrol (3/23 Infantry) ambushed south of DMZ. One U.S. KIA; unknown KPA losses.
- 5 April: 2ID guard post engaged KPA infiltrators south of DMZ. No U.S. losses; five KPA KIA.
- 29 April: 2ID patrol ambushed KPA infiltrators south of DMZ. No U.S. losses; one KPA KIA, one KPA WIA, one KPA captured.
- 22 May: 2ID barracks (1/23 Infantry) demolished by night time explosion south of DMZ. Two U.S. KIA, 17 U.S. WIA.
- 16 July: 2ID barrier position #32 overrun. Three U.S. KIA (2-23 Infantry), one KATUSA WIA.
- 10 August: 7ID construction team (B Company 2nd Battalion, 31st Infantry Regiment, 7th ID) ambushed well south of DMZ in daylight. Three U.S. KIA, sixteen U.S. WIA, one WIA later died of his wounds at 121st EVAC; unknown KPA losses.
- 15 August: 2ID Barrier position near Crab Island. Three armed enemy agents engaged in fire fight. Two agents killed and bodies recovered, one other believed killed in river, trying to escape.
- 22 August: 2ID jeep destroyed by mine and ambush south of DMZ. One U.S. KIA, one U.S. WIA; unknown KPA losses.
- 28 August: Eighth Army construction team (76th Engineers) ambushed in daylight near the Joint Security Area but still south of the DMZ. Two U.S. KIA, two KATUSA KIA, fourteen U.S. WIA, nine KATUSA WIA, three civilians WIA; unknown KPA losses.
- 29 August: 2ID jeep destroyed by mine south of DMZ. Three U.S. KIA, five U.S. WIA; no KPA losses.
- 7 October: 2ID patrol boat ambushed on Imjin River south of DMZ. One U.S. KIA; unknown KPA losses.

=== 1968 ===
- 20–21 January: 31 North Korean Unit 124 commandos crossed the border disguised as South Korean soldiers in an attempt to assassinate President Park Chung Hee at the Blue House. The failed mission resulted in 28 commandos killed, two presumed dead, and the last captured. 68 South Koreans were killed and 66 wounded, including about 24 civilians. Three Americans were killed and another three wounded in an attempt to prevent the commandos from escaping back via the DMZ.
- 22 January: 2ID guard post engaged by KPA infiltrators. Three U.S. WIA; unknown KPA losses.
- 23 January: Seizure of the USS Pueblo (AGER-2) off the east coast of North Korea. One U.S. KIA, nine U.S. WIA
- 24 January: 2ID position (1/23 Infantry) attacked south of DMZ by KPA Unit 124 exfiltrators. Two U.S. KIA; three KPA WIA.
- 26 January: 2ID defensive position (2/72 Armor) attacked south of DMZ by KPA Unit 124 exfiltrators
- 29 January: 2ID patrols and outposts engaged and repulsed four teams of KPA infiltrators. No U.S. losses; unknown KPA losses.
- 6 February: 2ID guard post attacked. No U.S. losses; one KPA WIA.
- 27 March: 2ID reaction forces and ROK 25th Infantry Division ambushed KPA infiltrators. No U.S. losses; three KPA KIA.
- 14 April: U.S. Army Support Group truck ambushed south of the Joint Security Area, close to midnight on Easter Sunday. Two U.S. KIA, two KATUSA KIA, two U.S. WIA; unknown KPA losses.
- 20 April: 2ID (2/23 Infantry) patrol ambushed in DMZ near MDL one U.S. WIA one KPA KIA
- 21 April: 7ID patrol (2/31 Infantry) engaged KPA infiltrator company in the DMZ. One U.S. KIA, three U.S. WIA; five KPA KIA, fifteen KPA WIA.
- 27 April: 7ID patrol (2/31 Infantry) ambushed in the DMZ. One KATUSA KIA, two U.S. WIA; unknown KPA losses.
- 3 July: 2ID patrol ambushed in the DMZ. One U.S. WIA; unknown KPA losses.
- 20 July: 2ID patrol ambushed in the DMZ. One U.S. KIA; unknown KPA losses. 7ID patrol (1st Battalion, 32nd Infantry Regiment) ambushed in the DMZ. One U.S. KIA; unknown KPA losses.
- 21 July: 2ID patrol (2nd Battalion, 38th Infantry Regiment) ambushed in the DMZ. One U.S. WIA, one KATUSA WIA.
- 30 July: 2ID patrol (3/23 Infantry) ambushed in the DMZ. One U.S. KIA, three U.S. WIA; unknown KPA losses.
- 5 August: 2ID patrol (1/38 Infantry) ambushed south of the DMZ in daylight. One U.S. KIA, four U.S. WIA; one KPA KIA.
- 18 August: 7ID patrol (1/32 Infantry) ambushed south of the DMZ. Two U.S. KIA; two KPA WIA.
- 19 September: 2ID patrols (2/38 Infantry) and quick reaction forces (4th Squadron, 7th Cavalry Regiment, 2nd Battalion, 9th Infantry Regiment (Mechanized) and the 2nd Division Counter Agent Company) isolated and destroyed KPA infiltrator squad. Two KATUSA KIA, six KATUSA WIA; four KPA KIA, one KPA WIA.
- 27 September: 2ID jeep ambushed in the DMZ. Two U.S. KIA; unknown KPA losses.
- 3 October: 7ID guard post (1/31 Infantry) engaged KPA exfiltrator south of DMZ. No U.S. losses; one KPA KIA.
- 5 October: 2ID patrol ambushed in the DMZ. One U.S. KIA, two U.S. WIA; unknown KPA losses.
- 10 October: 2ID boat patrol engaged KPA infiltrator crossing the Imjin River. No U.S. losses; one KPA KIA.
- 11 October: 2ID patrol ambushed KPA infiltrators in the DMZ. No U.S. losses; two KPA KIA.
- 23 October: 2ID patrol engaged KPA infiltrators in the DMZ. One U.S. KIA and five WIA; one KPA KIA.
- 30 October: Ulchin-Samcheok (Gangwon Province) landings by 120 men of KPA Unit 124; 110 of them were killed, 7 were captured and 3 escaped. 40 ROKA and Police were KIA and 23 civilians were killed. Three U.S. KIA and three WIA.

=== 1969 ===
- 23 January: 2ID guard posts repulsed KPA infiltrators. No U.S. losses; unknown KPA losses.
- 4 February: 2ID guard posts repulsed KPA infiltrators. No U.S. losses; unknown KPA losses.
- 13 March: 2ID fence repair patrol (2/38 Infantry) engaged by KPA infiltrators. No U.S. losses; unknown KPA losses.
- 15 March: 2ID marker maintenance patrol ambushed in the DMZ. One U.S. KIA, two U.S. WIA, one KATUSA WIA. Medical evacuation helicopter crashed after takeoff, killing five airmen and the three wounded.
- 16 March: 2ID patrol engaged KPA infiltrators in the DMZ. No U.S. losses; unknown KPA losses.
- 20 March: 2ID patrol engaged KPA patrol in the DMZ. No U.S. losses; unknown KPA losses.
- 29 March: 2ID patrol engaged KPA patrol in the DMZ. No U.S. losses; unknown KPA losses.
- 7 April: Six North Korean infiltrators crossed the border near Chumunjin, Gangwon Province and killed a South Korean policeman on guard duty
- 15 April: KPAF fighters shoot down a US Navy EC-121 Warning Star aircraft over the Sea of Japan (East Sea); 31 U.S. crewmen killed.
- 15 May: 2ID patrol engaged KPA infiltrator. One U.S. WIA, one KATUSA WIA; unknown KPA losses.
- 20 May: 2ID guard post engaged KPA infiltrators. No U.S. losses; one KPA KIA.
- 21 July: 2ID guard posts engaged and repulsed KPA infiltrators. No U.S. losses; unknown KPA losses.
- 17 August: Eighth Army OH-23 helicopter (59th Aviation Company) strayed north of the DMZ and was shot down. Three U.S. captured and finally released on 3 December 1969.
- 18 October: 7ID jeep ambushed in the DMZ. Four U.S. KIA; unknown KPA losses

== See also ==
- Neutral Nations Supervisory Commission (NNSC)
- List of border incidents involving North Korea
- 1976 Axe murder incident
- 1999 First Battle of Yeonpyeong
- 2002 Second Battle of Yeonpyeong
- 2009 Battle of Daecheong
- 2010 ROKS Cheonan sinking
- 2010 Bombardment of Yeonpyeong
