= Military Cemetery for North Korean Soldiers =

Cemetery in Paju, South Korea

- South Korea
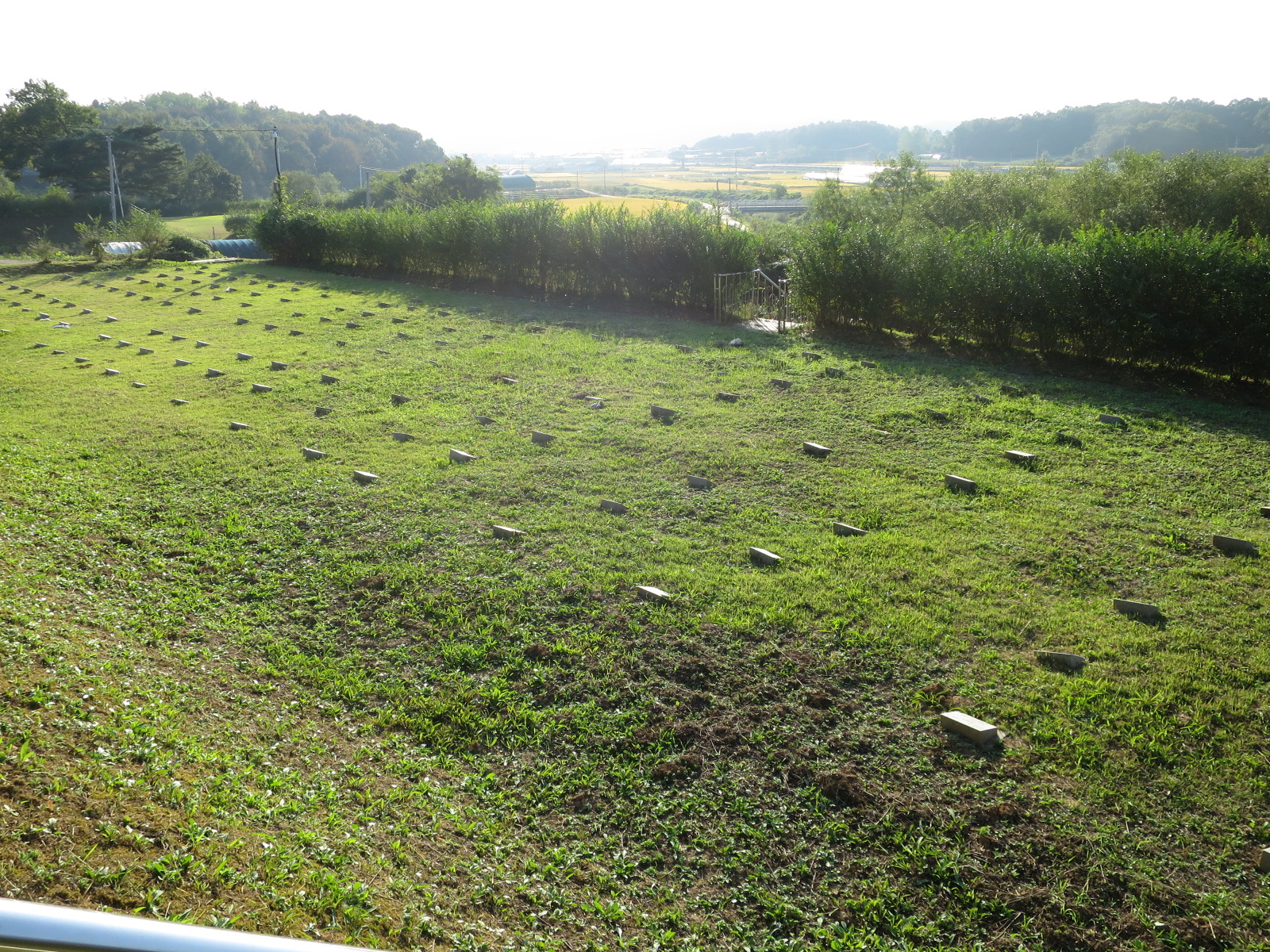
- Cemetery 2 graves looking north
- Used for those deceased 1950–present
- Established: July 1996
- Location: Jajang-Ro, Papyeong-myeon (파평면), Paju, South Korea; 37°57′26″N 126°51′11″E
- Total burials: 770+

Military Cemetery for North Korean Soldiers (Korean: 북한군 묘지 제 1 묘역; RR: buk-han-gun myo-ji je 1 myo-yeok), formerly the Cemetery for North Korean and Chinese Soldiers (Korean: 북한군/중국군 묘지 제 1 묘역; RR: buk-han-gun/jung-guk-gun myo-ji je 1 myo-yeok), and also known as the Enemy Cemetery, located in Jajang-Ro, Papyeong-myeon (파평면), Paju, South Korea, is a burial ground for North Korean casualties of the Korean War and North Korean agents killed in South Korea since the end of the war. The cemetery formerly contained the remains of 541 Chinese People's Volunteer Army soldiers but these were all repatriated between March 2014 and March 2016.

== History ==
The cemetery was established in July 1996 as a centralized burial place for the remains of Korean People's Army and People's Volunteer Army soldiers recovered from battlefield exhumations across South Korea and for North Korean agents killed in South Korea since the end of the Korean War.

Until 2024, North Korea has refused to accept the repatriation of the remains of its personnel on the basis that North Korea has sovereignty over all of Korea and the soldiers accordingly are already buried on Korean soil. Also, the acceptance of the bodies of agents would amount to acknowledgment of espionage operations denied by North Korea. Since 2024, North Korea has adopted a new policy which considers South Korea a separate "hostile" state, though it is unknown whether North Korea would accept future repatriations, or even demand that the bodies currently in Paju be reburied in North Korea, as a consequence.

The graves were originally in the form of traditional Korean burial mounds with plain wooden markers facing north towards North Korea (approximately 5 kilometers away). The majority of the graves are marked 무명 (mumyeong, meaning "anonymous"), while those of North Korean agents are marked with 간첩 (gancheop, meaning "spy") followed by the name if known. The cemetery receives few visitors because the South Korean intelligence services monitored the site to detect North Korean sympathizers, though the services say they no longer monitor the site.

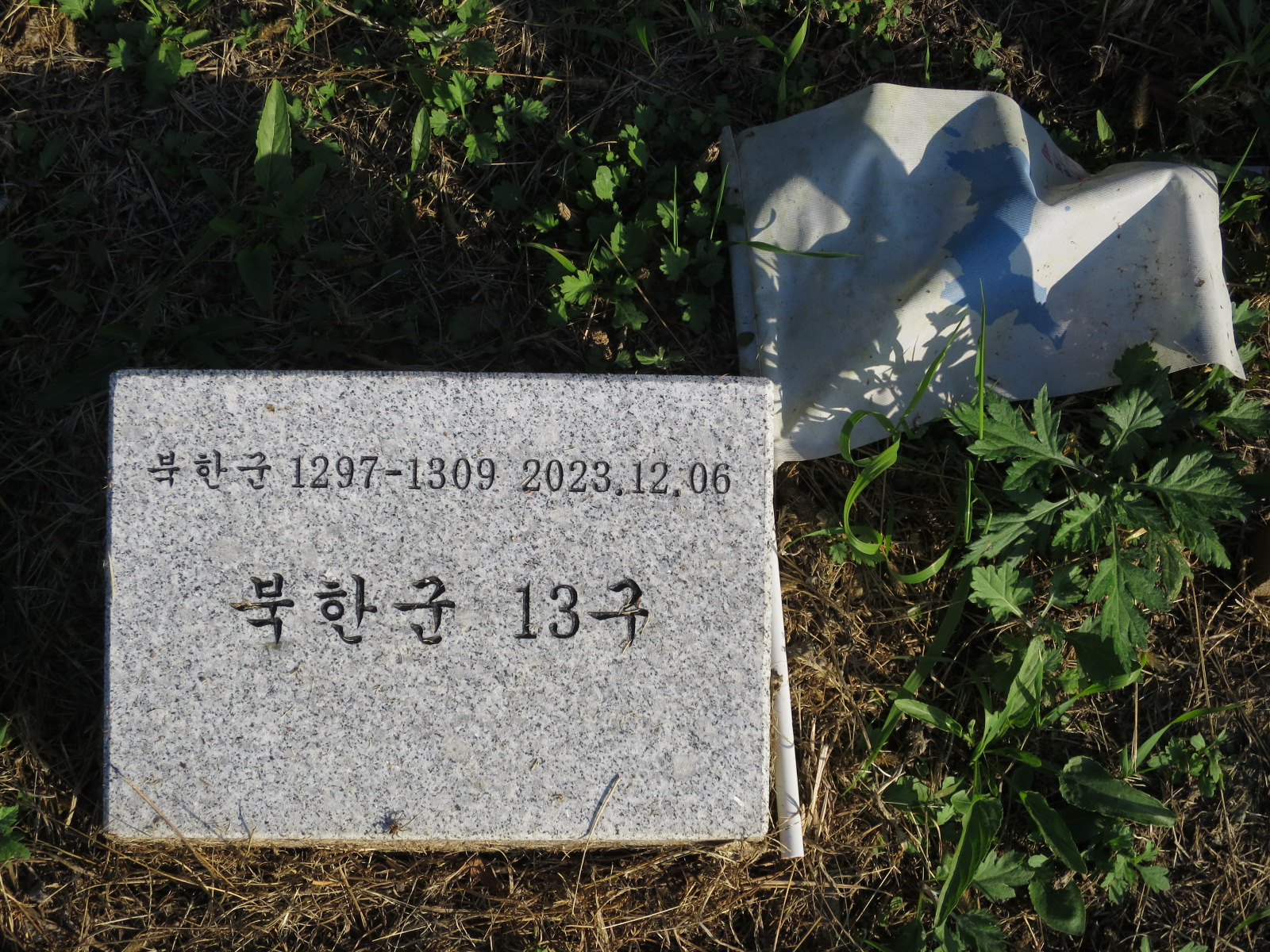
Grave of 13 North Korean privates buried in December 2023

South Korea had previously returned the remains of Chinese soldiers to North Korea through the Neutral Nations Supervisory Commission which then repatriated them to China. From 1981 to 1989, 42 sets of remains were returned in this manner, however in 1997, North Korea refused to accept any further Chinese remains. Following a visit by South Korean President Park Geun-hye to Beijing in June 2013, it was agreed that the remains of the Chinese soldiers would be repatriated directly to China. The exhumation of the remains started in December 2013 and on 17 March 2014, the repatriation of the remains of the 437 Chinese soldiers took place. The remains were interred in the Resist America and Aid Korea Martyrs Cemetery in Shenyang, China.

Renovation plans for the cemetery were considered in 2012, but they met with opposition in South Korea and were not carried out.

The original burial mounds and wooden markers have since been replaced by flat graves with engraved stone markers.

== Notable burials ==
- The 29 members of Unit 124 killed in the Blue House raid in 1968
- Kim Sung-il, North Korean agent responsible for the bombing of Korean Air Flight 858 in 1987

== See also ==
- Daejeon National Cemetery
- Seoul National Cemetery
- United Nations Memorial Cemetery, in Busan, South Korea
