= 26th Mechanized Division =

26th Mechanized Division may refer to:

- 26th Mechanized Infantry Division (South Korea)
- 26th Guards Mechanized Division, Soviet Union
- 26th Mechanized Division (Soviet Union)

== See also ==
- 25th Division (disambiguation)
