= Pak Jae-gyong =

North Korean politician and soldier (born 1933)

- 박재경

Personal details
- Born: 10 June 1933 (age 92) North Hamgyong Province in Korea under Japanese rule
- Citizenship: North Korean
- Party: Workers' Party of Korea
- Occupation: Politician, Korean People's Army General, Vice Minister in the Ministry of People's Armed Forces, Delegate of the 12th Supreme People's Assembly

Military service
- Allegiance: North Korea
- Branch/service: Korean People's Army
- Rank: General

Korean name
- Hangul: 박재경
- Hanja: 朴在慶
- RR: Bak Jaegyeong
- MR: Pak Chaegyŏng

Pak Jae-gyong (Korean: 박재경; born 10 June 1933) is a North Korean politician and soldier. A general in the Korean People's Army (KPA), Pak is a Vice Minister in the Ministry of People's Armed Forces as well as a full member of the Central Committee of the Workers' Party of Korea (WPK). Pak is also a delegate of the 12th Supreme People's Assembly (SPA). On the death of Kim Shin-jo on 9 April 2025, he became the only living survivor of 31-member commando unit, known as Unit 124, that was sent to assassinate South Korean president Park Chung Hee in the ultimately unsuccessful Blue House raid in 1968.

== Early life and education ==
Pak was born in North Hamgyong Province while Korea was under Japanese rule and attended the Kim Il-Sung Political and Military College.

== Blue House raid ==
Pak was one of thirty-one men handpicked for the 1968 Blue House raid (also known as the January 21 Incident in South Korea), an assassination attempt on the life of South Korean President Park Chung Hee. Pak was one of only two survivors of the failed mission, the other being Kim Shin-jo, and was the only one to escape back to the North.

== Military and political career ==
In February 1985, he assumed the role of brigadier general of the Korean People's Army (KPA), and was made Head of the Propaganda Department of the General Political Bureau of the Korean People's Army. In 1989, Pak took on the role of political commissar of the 4th Corps of the KPA, and in January 1993 was promoted to major general. Through the December by-elections of the same year, Pak was elected as an official of the Central Committee of the Workers' Party of Korea (WPK).

In June 1994, Pak was promoted to the rank of lieutenant general. In September of the same year, he was appointed General Director of the Propaganda Department under the General Political Bureau. In August 1995 he was re-elected as a member of the Central Committee of the WPK. Pak was promoted to general of the KPA in February 1997.

In September 2000, Pak Jae-gyong accompanied Kim Yong-sun, the then vice-chairman of the Committee for the Peaceful Reunification of the Fatherland, on his trip to South Korea at the invitation of then president Kim Dae-jung. Pak presented three tons of the famous Chilbo Mountain pine mushrooms as a present from Kim Jong Il.

In 2007, Pak delivered another gift of pine mushrooms, this time weighing four tons, when he called on President Roh Moo-hyun. It is speculated that the choice of Pak was in part due to his involvement in the Blue House raid, and that sending him was a way of mocking the South.

From 2007 onwards, Pak has been a Vice Minister in the Ministry of People's Armed Forces and in September 2010 was appointed a member of the Central Committee of the WPK.

Pak served as a delegate of the 10th and 11th Supreme People's Assembly (SPA) and since April 2009 has been a delegate of the 12th SPA.

Over the years, Pak has been a member of the State Funeral Committee for the deaths of Kim Il Sung, O Jin-u, Yon Hyong-muk, Pak Song-chol, Jo Myong-rok and Kim Jong Il.

In 2023, Pak participated in the military parade for the 70th anniversary of the end of the Korean War.

== Awards and honors ==
A picture of Pak shows Pak wearing the ribbons to all decorations awarded to him.

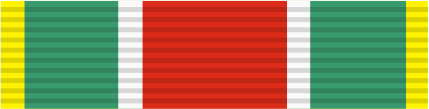

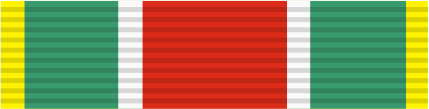

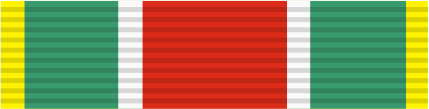

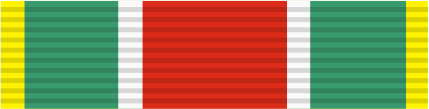

== See also ==
- Comparative military ranks of Korea
- Politics of North Korea
