= USS Guam =

USS Guam may refer to:

- USS Guam (PG-43) was a river gunboat in China, renamed Wake in January 1941 and captured by the Japanese in December of the same year
- USS Guam (CB-2) was an Alaska-class cruiser in service from 1944 to 1947
- USS Guam (LPH-9) was an Iwo Jima-class amphibious assault ship in service from 1965 to 1998
- USNS Guam (HST-1), formerly HSC Huakai, is a ferry used to transport troops in Okinawa
