= Kim Shin-jo =

North Korean defector (1942–2025)

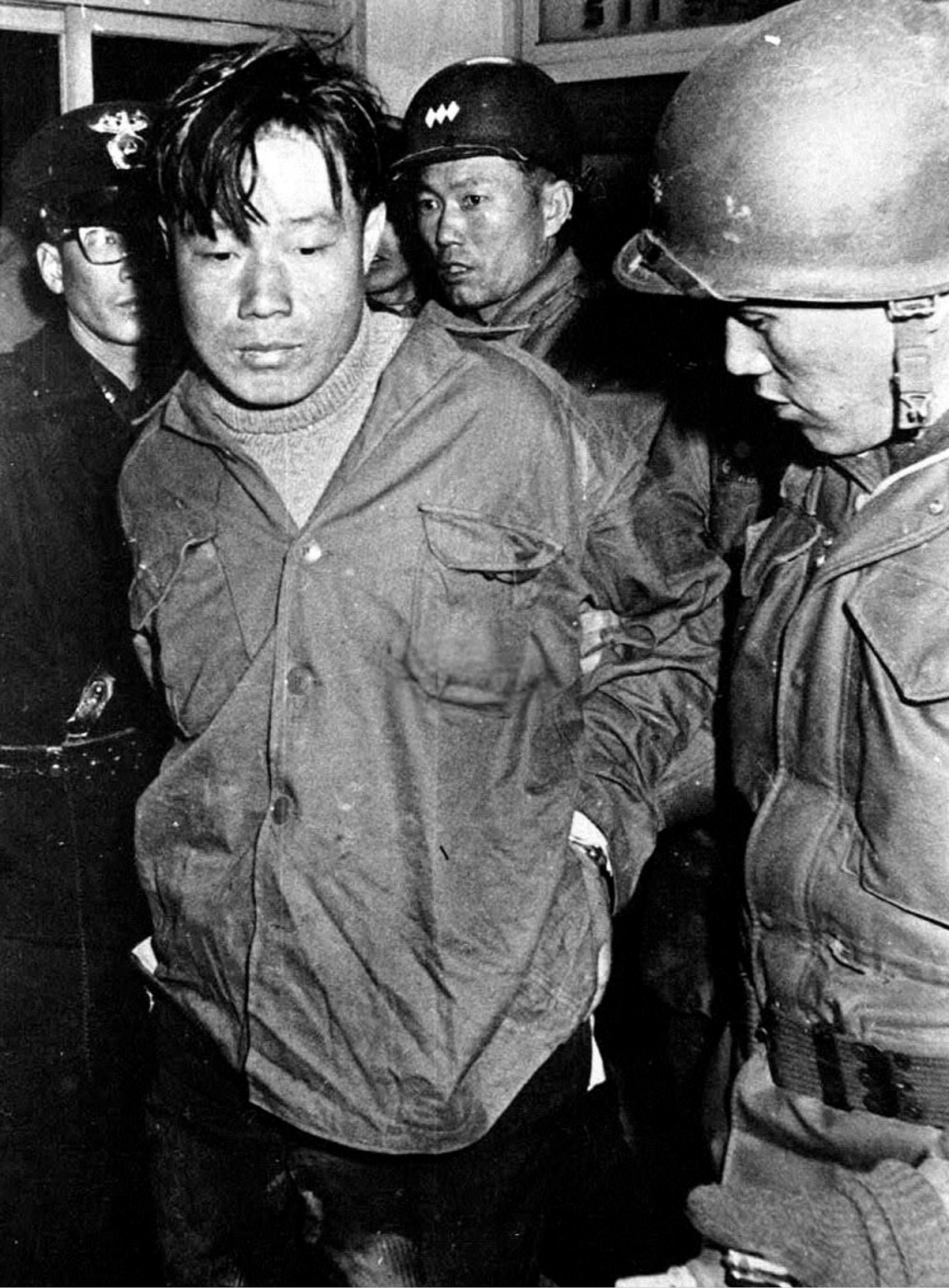
- Kim in captivity following the Blue House raid, 1968
- Born: 2 June 1942; Seishin, Kankyōhoku Province, Korea, Empire of Japan
- Died: 9 April 2025 (aged 82); Seoul, South Korea
- Citizenship: North Korea (1942–1970); South Korea (1970–2025)
- Occupation: North Korean Army soldier and South Korean church pastor

Korean name
- Hangul: 김신조
- Hanja: 金新朝
- RR: Gim Sinjo
- MR: Kim Sinjo

Kim Shin-jo (Korean: 김신조; 2 June 1942 – 9 April 2025) was a North Korean soldier and defector who was one of two survivors of the 31-man team of North Korean commandos, known as Unit 124, sent to assassinate the then-president of South Korea and military dictator, Park Chung Hee, in the Blue House raid in January 1968. Kim was captured and during a year-long detention and interrogation divulged information on the raid to the South Korean authorities, before being released. He became a South Korean citizen and spent the rest of his life there.

== Biography ==
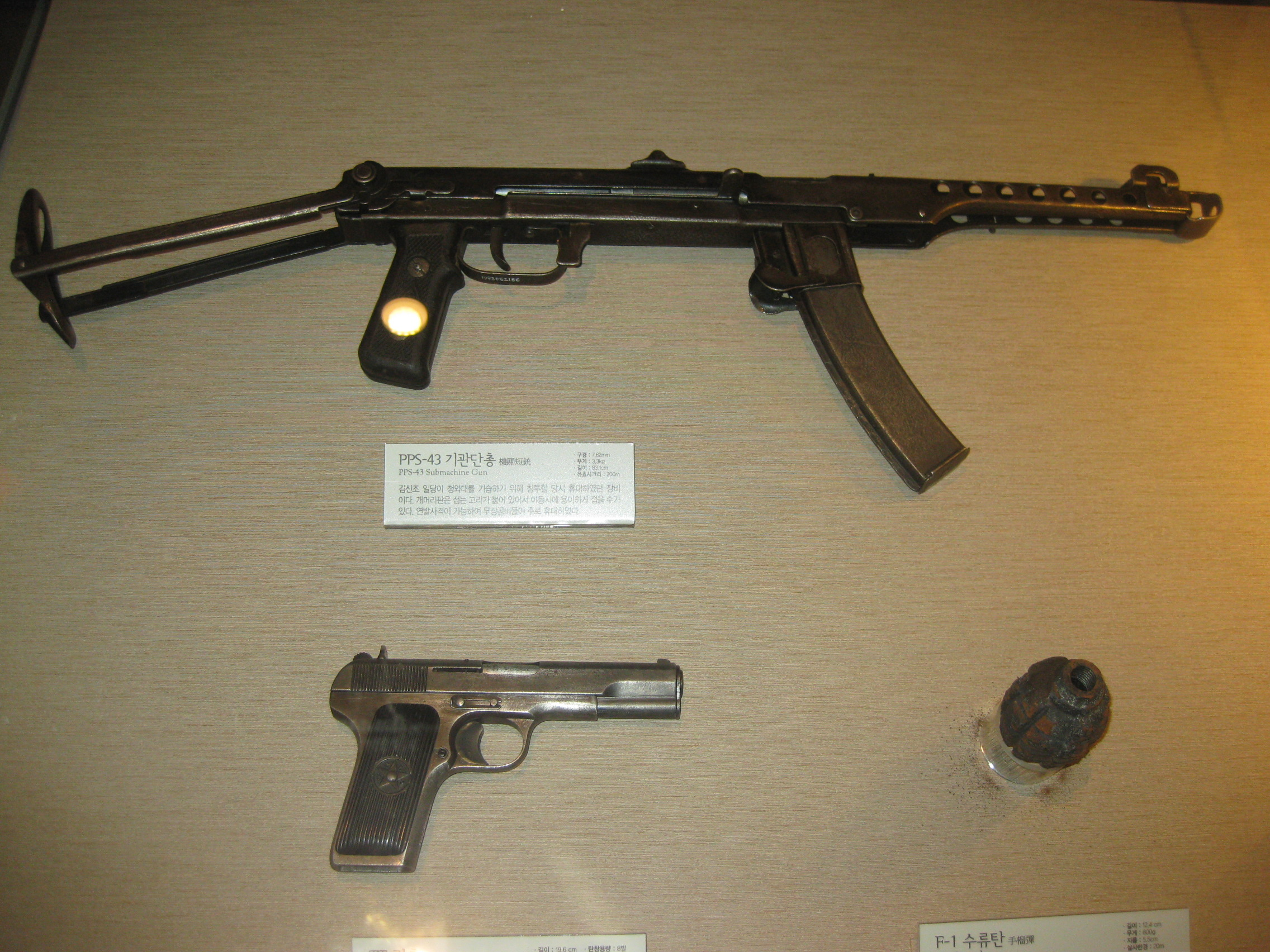
PPS-43, TT pistol and grenade used by Kim Shin-jo during the Blue House raid

Born on 2 June 1942, Kim Shin-Jo joined the North Korean forces and was integrated into a new unit of elite North Korean commandos, known as Unit 124, created to infiltrate South Korea and assassinate its leader, the military dictator Park Chung Hee, as part of a plan for socialist revolution and reunification of Korea under the North Korean government. This plot later became known as the Blue House raid, named after the Blue House, the residency of the president of South Korea. Kim described himself as being deeply communist in ideology to a "fanatical" level during that period of his life.

Kim, a lieutenant, was part of the assault element that was to take over the first floor of the building to allow the other commandos to go upstairs and kill Park. Having been trained for two years before the mission, including with a mockup of the Blue House built in North Korea for military training exercises, they crossed the DMZ border, disguised as South Korean soldiers. They were found by four woodcutters, the Woo brothers, who were in the woods of Sambong Mountain. The brothers initially believed the disguised soldiers were a border patrol, until they noticed that one of them had his rank insignia on upside down. The unit revealed themselves to be North Koreans coming to "liberate them and bring communism to South Korea". Kim Shin-Jo, in the debate between the commandos about what to do with the Woo brothers, wished to kill them "on the altar of revolution" to prevent them from alerting other South Koreans. However, the captain of the raid, Kim Jong-ung, refused, saying they would not be able to bury the bodies because the ground was frozen. Instead, the captain lectured the brothers on the virtues of communism and made them sign a pact promising them jobs in the new revolutionary government in exchange for their silence. Once the commando unit had left, the Woo brothers reported them to the nearest military post; South Korean police and army went into action to stop them, but they had disguised themselves as civilians and managed to avoid detection for the most part until they were close to the capital Seoul. When the commandos' captain judged the Capital Garrison Command too difficult for them to evade, he ordered the unit (including Kim) to disperse and retreat to North Korea.

Kim, deeply embittered by the failure of his unit to accomplish its mission, and what he saw as bad decisions by Captain Kim Jong-ung preventing him from having done his duty, decided he would not return to North Korea. He felt he had done nothing with his life up to that point, and preferred to stay alive rather than follow the order to retreat. In the ensuing retreat, the majority of the unit commandos were killed by the South Korean forces. The only other survivor besides Kim, Pak Jae-gyong, made it back to North Korea, but Kim Shin-jo was captured by South Korean forces, surrendering in a house in Inwang Mountain near Seoul. He was detained for a year during which he was interrogated by the South Korean authorities before being released and becoming a citizen of South Korea in 1970, when they said they were satisfied that he had simply been "following orders"; his cooperation with them was also a factor in his release. South Korean officials and North Korean defectors who talked with Kim Shin-jo claimed that when news of his South Korean citizenship reached North Korean authorities, his parents were executed and his relatives were purged. Kim Shin-jo believed this claim to be true.

Kim was ordained as a pastor in 1997 and worked at Sungrak Sambong Church in Gyeonggi Province. He had a wife and two children. Kim met his wife as a penpal during his detention, and initially feared she was a North Korean assassin and sleeper agent coming after him. She later convinced him to convert to her faith, and six months after he was released without charges they were married.

Kim died in Seoul on 9 April 2025, at the age of 82.

== Legacy ==
The hiking trail from Yeoraesa Temple to Samcheonggak on Bugaksan mountain, Seoul, is named the Kim Shin-Jo Trail and was part of the route used by Unit 124 in the Blue House Raid.
