= Unit 124 =

North Korean special operations unit

- The bodies of five members of Unit 124, killed during the Blue House raid of 1968
- Active: 1966^{1} – 1968^{2}
- Country: North Korea
- Branch: North Korean Special Operation Force
- Type: Special forces
- Role: Black operation
- Size: 31
- Garrison/HQ: Yonsan
- Engagements: Korean DMZ Conflict: Blue House raid

Unit 124 (Korean: 124부대) was a black operations unit of the North Korean Special Operation Forces formed to assassinate South Korean President Park Chung Hee in the Blue House raid in January 1968. Twenty-nine of the 31-member unit were killed in the ultimately unsuccessful operation.

== Formation ==
Unit 124 was established from thirty-one handpicked officers of the Korean People's Army (KPA), the army of North Korea, specifically to infiltrate South Korea across the Demilitarized Zone (DMZ) and assassinate Park Chung Hee, the President of South Korea, in his official residence at the Blue House in Seoul. Park was a de facto dictator who faced significant domestic opposition and from 1966 was engaged in the Korean DMZ Conflict against North Korea. By 1967, the North Korean leadership concluded that Park's domestic opposition no longer constituted a serious challenge to his rule due to his authoritarianism and success in the presidential and legislative elections that year.

However, the North Korean leadership believed that killing Park would cause political turmoil in South Korea, creating an environment for a communist revolution and a North Korean-led insurgency against the South Korean government, similar to the North Vietnamese technique occurring in the Vietnam War. The specially recruited men of Unit 124 received two years of rigorous training for the operation to cross into South Korea and reach and kill Park, including two weeks of rehearsing action on the objective in a full-scale mockup of the Blue House.

The unit's manpower was later used to create the XI Corps from 1969.

== Blue House raid ==
Kim Shin-jo, the only member of the unit to be captured by South Korean forces

On 17 January 1968, Unit 124 successfully penetrated the DMZ into Gyeonggi province of South Korea, undetected by the United States Army's 2nd Infantry Division and the Republic of Korea Army (ROKA), and camped on the west bank of the Imjin River. On 19 January, Unit 124 crossed the Imjin River and marched undetected through rural Gyeonggi towards Seoul until the early afternoon when they encountered four civilians near Beopwon, a village 7 kilometers east of Paju, who immediately reported them to the local police. Unit 124, aware that security forces in Seoul were alerted to their presence, changed into uniforms of the local ROKA 26th Infantry Division and broke into groups of 2 to 3 men. The unit evaded detection from police and ROKA until 10 p.m. on January 21, when they were questioned at a checkpoint on Jongro less than 100 meters from the Blue House. Unit 124 was detected when the local police chief, suspicious of their answers, drew his pistol at them and was subsequently shot, prompting a shootout and widespread manhunt.

The Blue House raid failed and 29 of the 31 members of Unit 124 were killed by South Korean security forces or had committed suicide by 29 January. One member, Kim Shin-jo, was captured and divulged information on the raid to the South Korean authorities during interrogation for a year before being released and becoming a South Korean citizen. Just one member of the unit, Pak Jae-gyong, made it back to North Korea and went on to become a general in the Korean People's Army, a Vice Minister in the Ministry of People's Armed Forces, and assistant to Kim Jong-il. Although Unit 124 was believed to have been disbanded after the raid, it has been succeeded by the KPA's Special Battalions, part of the Reconnaissance Agency, formed to conduct intelligence gathering, espionage, terrorism and abduction operations in South Korea.

== See also ==
- 209th Detachment, 2325th Group – South Korean counterpart formed to assassinate North Korean leader Kim Il-sung

== Notes ==
^1 The founding date of Unit 124 is unknown but the unit is known to have been active for at least two years before January 1968.
^2 The disbandment date of Unit 124 is believed to be January 1968 but this is unconfirmed.
