= 25th Infantry Division (South Korea) =

- 25보병사단
- Active: April 21 1953 – present
- Country: South Korea
- Branch: Republic of Korea Army
- Type: Infantry
- Size: Division
- Part of: I Corps
- Garrison/HQ: Yangju, Gyeonggi Province
- Nickname: 비룡 (Bi-ryong / Flying Dragon)
- March: 25th Division Hymn

Commanders
- Current commander: Maj. Gen. Go Tae-nam

- 25th Infantry Division
- Hangul: 이십오보병사단
- Hanja: 二十五步兵師團
- RR: Isip o bobyeong sadan
- MR: Isip o pobyŏng sadan

The 25th Infantry Division (Korean: 25보병사단; Hanja: 二十五步兵師團), also known as Flying Dragon Division (비룡부대; 飛龍部隊), is a military formation of the Republic of Korea Army and is unit is one of three divisions under the command of the I Corps. One of the regiment's reconnaissance companies from the 25th infantry division found the North Korean-made 1st infiltration tunnel on November 15, 1974.

== Organization ==
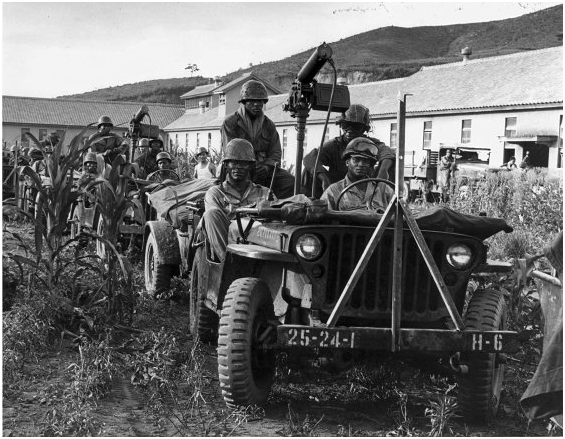
Soldiers of the 25th Infantry Division in 1950s.

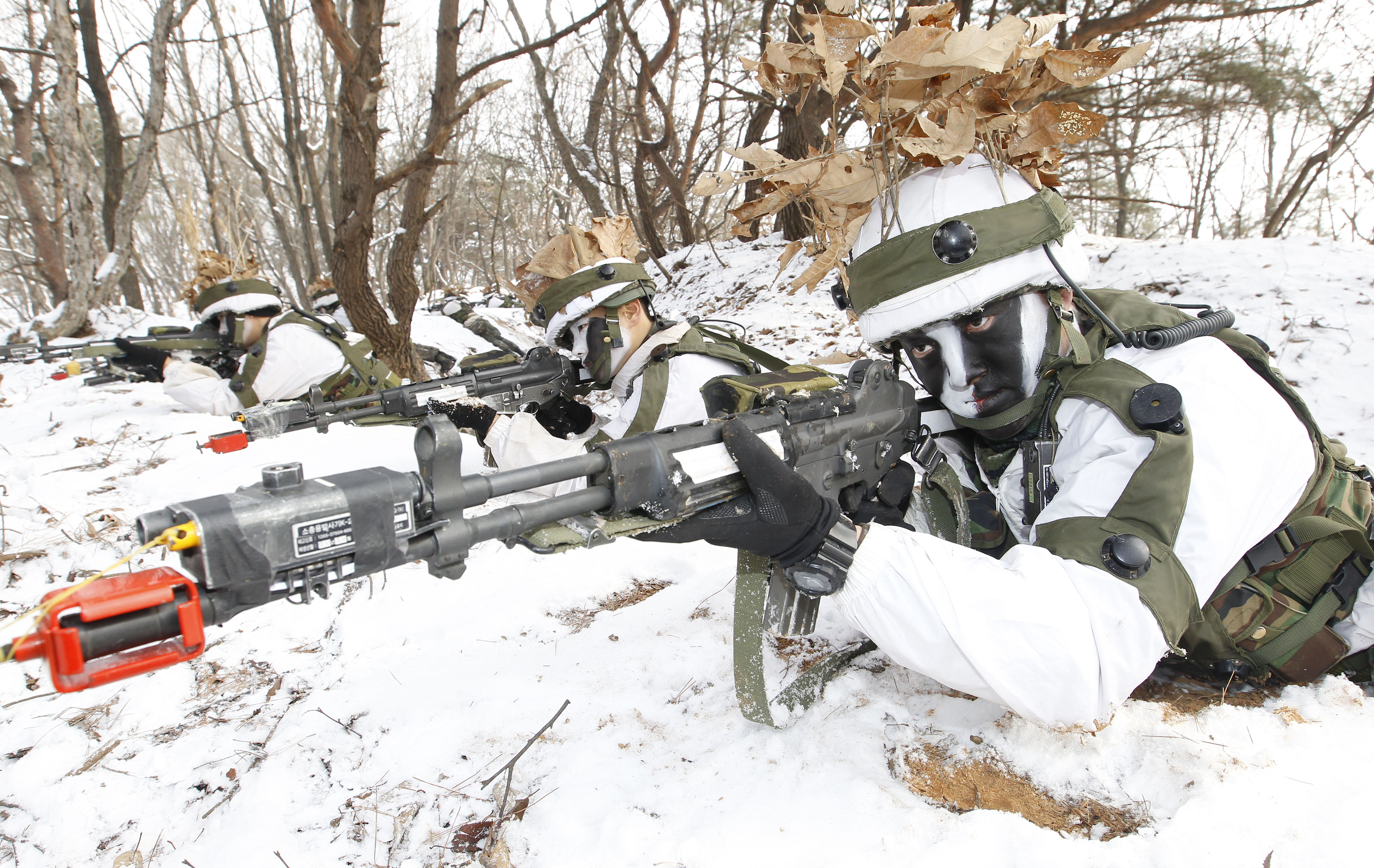
Soldiers of the 25th Infantry Division during combat training (their gun barrels are mounted with MILES training device).

- Headquarters:
  - Headquarters Company
  - Intelligence Company
  - Air Defense Company
  - Reconnaissance Battalion
  - Engineer Battalion
  - Armored Battalion
  - Multiple Rocket Launcher Battalion (equipped with K239 MLRS)
  - Signal Battalion
  - Support Battalion
  - Military Police Battalion
  - Medical Battalion
  - Chemical Battalion
- 70th Infantry Brigade (equipped with K808 APCs)
- 71st Infantry Brigade (equipped with K808 APCs)
- 72nd Infantry Brigade (equipped with K808 APCs)
- Artillery Brigade (equipped with K9 SPHs)
