= Yonsan County =

Yŏnsan County 연산군
- County

Korean transcription(s)
  - Hanja: 延山郡
  - McCune-Reischauer: Yŏnsan-gun
  - Revised Romanization: Yeonsan-gun
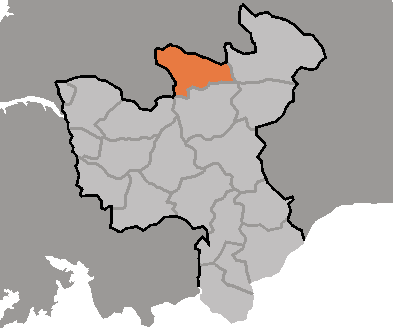
- Map of North Hwanghae showing the location of Yonsan
- Country: North Korea
- Province: North Hwanghae Province

Area
  - Total: 547.5 km^{2} (211.4 sq mi)

Population (2008)
  - Total: 66,568
  - Density: 121.6/km^{2} (314.9/sq mi)

Yŏnsan County is a county in North Hwanghae province, North Korea.

== Administrative divisions ==
Yŏnsan county is divided into 1 ŭp (town), 1 rodongjagu (workers' district) and 14 ri (villages):

- Yŏnsan-ŭp
- Holdong-rodongjagu
- Kongp'o-ri
- Oktŏng-ri
- Panch'ŏl-li
- Pangjŏng-ri
- Saenggŭm-ri
- Sanggong-ri
- Sillang-ri
- Songch'ol-li
- Songsal-li
- Taegul-li
- Taep'yŏng-ri
- Taeryong-ri
- Taesal-li
- Toch'i-ri

== Infrastructure ==
Yonsan has a hydropower station with two generator units. The first unit commenced operation on 9 September 2008.

== Transportation ==
Yonsan County has a trolleybus line in Holdong-rodongjagu; it is observed to run west to a tunnel entrance from next to a building in Holdong-rodongjagu. The state of operation is unknown and no trolleybuses can be observed from satellite imagery.

== Historic sites ==
The tomb complex of Kongp'o-ri
