= 26th Mechanized Infantry Division (South Korea) =

Military unit, 1953 to 2018

- 제26기계화보병사단
- Active: June 18, 1953 – November 30, 2018
- Country: South Korea
- Branch: Republic of Korea Army
- Type: Infantry
- Size: Mechanized infantry
- Part of: VII Maneuver Corps
- Garrison/HQ: Yangju, Gyeonggi Province
- Nickname: Biryong (Flying Dragon)
- March: 26th Division Hymn

Commanders
- Current commander: Maj. Gen. Go Tae-nam

The 26th Mechanized Infantry Division (Korean: 제26기계화보병사단, Hanja: 第二十六機械化步兵師團) ("Bulmuri Unit") was a mechanized infantry division under the VII Maneuver Corps of the Republic of Korea Army stationed in Yangju, Gyeonggi-do . It was founded on June 18, 1953 in Nonsan, South Chungcheong Province, based on the 73rd, 75th, and 76th Infantry Regiments. Afterwards, the unit moved to Hwacheon, Yanggu, and Yeoncheon and to Yangju, Gyeonggi-do in 1964. On October 1, 1994, it was reorganized as the fourth mechanized infantry division in Korea. The salute slogan used 'attack' instead of 'loyalty', which is the army's standard slogan. On November 30, 2018, it was integrated into the 8th Maneuver Division and disbanded.

== Organization ==
- Headquarters:
  - Headquarters Company
  - Intelligence Company
  - Air Defense Company
  - Reconnaissance Battalion
  - Engineer Battalion
  - Armored Battalion
  - Signal Battalion
  - Support Battalion
  - Military Police Battalion
  - Medical Battalion
  - Chemical Battalion
- 3rd Mechanized Infantry Brigade
  - 121st Mechanized Infantry Battalion
  - 123rd Mechanized Infantry Battalion
  - 57th Tank Battalion
- 75th Mechanized Infantry Brigade
  - 27th Tank Battalion
  - 38th Tank Battalion
  - 125th Mechanized Infantry Battalion
- 76th Mechanized Infantry Brigade
  - 120th Mechanized Infantry Battalion
  - 126th Mechanized Infantry Battalion
  - 25th Tank Battalion
- Divisional Artillery Brigade
  - 222nd Artillery Battalion
  - 228th Artillery Battalion
  - 231st Artillery Battalion
  - 631st Artillery Battalion
