= Structure of the Republic of Korea Army =

The following lists active units within the structure of the Republic of Korea Army.

On 1 December 2020, all subordinate regiments of each division in the army reorganized into brigades. As of July 2023, the army has 2 field armies, 6 corps and 34 divisions.

== Republic of Korea Army Headquarters ==
=== Direct (직할부대) ===
- Army Capital Defense Command
  - Direct
    - Headquarters Unit
    - 35th Special Mission Battalion
    - 1st Air Defense Brigade
    - 1st Security Group
    - 122nd Signal Group
    - 1113th Engineer Corps
    - Capital Defense Command Military Police Group
    - Shield Education Corps
  - Attached
    - 52nd Infantry Division
    - 56th Infantry Division
- Army Special Warfare Command
  - Headquarters Unit
  - 707th Special Mission Group
  - 1st Special Forces Brigade
  - 3rd Special Forces Brigade
  - 7th Special Forces Brigade
  - 9th Special Forces Brigade
  - 11th Special Forces Brigade
  - 13th Special Mission Brigade
  - International Peace Supporting Standby Force
    - Special Warfare Unit in UAE
    - Dongmyeong Unit
    - Hanbit Unit
  - Army Special Warfare School
- Army Aviation Command
  - 1st Combat Aviation Brigade
  - 2nd Combat Aviation Brigade
  - Aviation Maintenance Brigade
  - Medical Evacuation Aviation Group (MEDION)
- Army Logistics Command
  - Army Consolidated Maintenance Depot
  - Army Consolidated Supply Depot
  - Army Ammunition Support Command (9 ammunition depots)
- Army Training & Doctrine Command
  - Army Training Center
  - Army Infantry School
  - Army Armor School
  - Army Artillery School
  - Army Air Defence School
  - Army Engineer School
  - Army Intelligence School
  - Army Signal School
  - Army Aviation School
  - Army CBRN School
  - Army Logistics School
  - Army Administrative School
  - Army Non-Commissioned Officer Academy
  - Battle Command Training Program Group
  - Korea Combat Training Center
- Army Mobilization Force Command
  - Direct
    - Headquarters Unit
    - Army Mobilize Resources Escort Group
  - Attached
    - 60th Infantry Division
    - 66th Infantry Division
    - 72nd Infantry Division
    - 73rd Infantry Division
    - 75th Infantry Division
    - 31st Mobilization Support Group
    - 32nd Mobilization Support Group
    - 35th Mobilization Support Group
    - 36th Mobilization Support Group
    - 37th Mobilization Support Group
    - 39th Mobilization Support Group
    - 50th Mobilization Support Group
    - 51st Mobilization Support Group
    - 52nd Mobilization Support Group
    - 53rd Mobilization Support Group
    - 55th Mobilization Support Group
    - 56th Mobilization Support Group
- Army Missile & Strategy Command
- Army Personnel Command
- Korea Military Academy
- Korea Army Academy at Yeongcheon
- Army Cadet Military School
- Korea Army Officer Candidate School
- Other Units under the command of ROK Army Headquarters
  - Army Prosecutor's Office
  - Army Criminal Investigation Division
  - Army Data System Management Group
  - Army Institute of Military History
  - 2nd Security Group

=== Attached (예하부대) ===
- Army Ground Operations Command
- Army 2nd Operations Command

=== Army Ground Operations Command ===
- Direct
  - Headquarters Unit
  - Ground Information Group
  - 36th Infantry Division
  - 55th Infantry Division
  - Fires Brigade
  - 1101st Engineer Group
- Attached
  - Capital Corps
  - I Corps
  - II Corps
  - III Corps
  - V Corps
  - VII Maneuver Corps
  - 1st Logistic Support Command
    - Capital Logistic Support Group
    - 6th Logistic Support Group
    - 7th Logistic Support Group
    - 8th Logistic Support Group
    - Information Communication Brigade

==== Capital Corps ====
- Direct
  - Headquarters Unit
  - 700th Commando Regiment
  - 140th Intelligence Battalion
  - 100th Signal Group
  - 1175th Engineer Corps
  - 3rd Security Group
  - 10th Aviation Group
  - 10th Air Defense Brigade
  - 10th CBRN Battalion
- Attached
  - 17th Infantry Division
  - 51st Infantry Division
  - 2nd Marine Infantry Division
  - Capital Artillery Brigade

==== I Corps ====
- Direct
  - Headquarters Unit
  - 701st Commando Regiment
  - 141st Intelligence Battalion
  - 101st Signal Group
  - 301st Security Regiment
  - 11th Aviation Group
  - 11th CBRN Battalion
- Attached
  - 1st Infantry Division
  - 9th Infantry Division
  - 25th Infantry Division
  - 2nd Armored Brigade
  - 30th Armored Brigade
  - 1st Engineer Brigade
  - 1st Artillery Brigade
  - 1st Logistic Support Brigade

==== II Corps ====
- Direct
  - Headquarters Unit
  - 702nd Commando Regiment
  - 142nd Intelligence Battalion
  - 102nd Signal Group
  - 302nd Security Group
  - 12nd Aviation Group
  - 12th CBRN Battalion
- Attached
  - 7th Infantry Division
  - 15th Infantry Division
  - 3rd Armored Brigade
  - 2nd Engineer Brigade
  - 2nd Artillery Brigade
  - 2nd Logistic Support Brigade

==== III Corps ====
- Direct
  - Headquarters Unit
  - 703rd Commando Regiment
  - 143rd Intelligence Battalion
  - 103rd Signal Group
  - 303rd Security Regiment
  - 13th Aviation Group
  - 13th CBRN Battalion
- Attached
  - 1st Mountain Brigade
  - 12th Infantry Division
  - 21st Infantry Division
  - 22nd Infantry Division
  - 23rd Security Brigade
  - 20th Armored Brigade
  - 102nd Armored Brigade
  - 3rd Engineer Brigade
  - 3rd Artillery Brigade
  - 3rd Logistic Support Brigade

==== V Corps ====
- Direct
  - Headquarters Unit
  - 705th Commando Regiment
  - 145th Intelligence Battalion
  - 105th Signal Group
  - 305th Security Regiment
  - 15th Aviation Group
  - 15th CBRN Battalion
- Attached
  - 3rd Infantry Division
  - 5th Infantry Division
  - 6th Infantry Division
  - 1st Armored Brigade
  - 5th Armored Brigade
  - 5th Engineer Brigade
  - 5th Artillery Brigade
  - 5th Logistic Support Brigade

==== VII Maneuver Corps ====
- Direct
  - Headquarters Unit
  - 1st Air Assault Battalion
  - 2nd Air Assault Battalion
  - 107th Signal Group
  - 17th Aviation Group
  - 17th CBRN Battalion
- Attached
  - Capital Mechanized Infantry Division
  - 2nd Quick Response Division
  - 8th Maneuver Division
  - 11th Maneuver Division
  - 7th Engineer Brigade
  - 7th Artillery Brigade
  - 7th Logistic Support Group (belongs to 1st Logistic Support Command)

=== Army 2nd Operations Command ===
- Direct
  - Headquarters Unit
  - 1st Quick Maneuver Battalion
  - 12th Information & Communication Group
  - 21st Aviation Group
  - 1115th Engineer Group
  - 1117th Engineer Group
  - 19th CBRN Battalion
- Attached
  - 31st Infantry Division
  - 32nd Infantry Division
  - 35th Infantry Division
  - 37th Infantry Division
  - 39th Infantry Division
  - 50th Infantry Division
  - 53rd Infantry Division
  - 5th Logistic Support Command
    - 51st Logistics Group
    - 52nd Logistics Group
    - 53rd Logistics Group
