= List of equipment of the Republic of Korea Armed Forces =

== Attire & Equipment ==
Camouflage Patterns & Uniforms
Branch	Name	Image	Picture
Army	Granite B		
Navy	Introduce in May 2021 - a new blue-dominant camouflage pattern uniform to personnel serving on combat crews of combat surface ships and submarines.		
Marine Corps	Wavepat		
Air Force	Granite B		

Others
Name	In Service	Image	Picture
ROKPAT	ROK Special Warfare Command		
MARPAT-Style (Spec-Ops Pixel/Teuk-Jun-Pixel “특전픽셀”)	ROK Army - UN Missions		
Multicam	ROK UDT/SEALS		
Spec-Ops Desert Pixelated Camo	"Akh Unit" of the 707th Special Missions Group		

Dress Uniform, Service Uniform & Headgear
Branch	Name	Image	Name	Image	Name	Image	Name	Image
Army	Army Dress Uniform (Men)		Army Dress Uniform (Women)		Army Service Uniform (Men)		Army Service Uniform (Women)	
Navy	Navy Dress Uniform (Men)		Navy Dress Uniform (Women)		Navy Service Uniform (Men)		Navy Service Uniform (Women)	
Marine Corps	Marine Corps Dress Uniform (Men)		Marine Corps Dress Uniform (Women)		Marine Corps Service Uniform (Men)		Marine Corps Service Uniform (Women)	
Air Force	Air Force Dress Uniform (Men)		Air Force Dress Uniform (Women)		Air Force Service Uniform (Men)		Air Force Service Uniform (Women)	

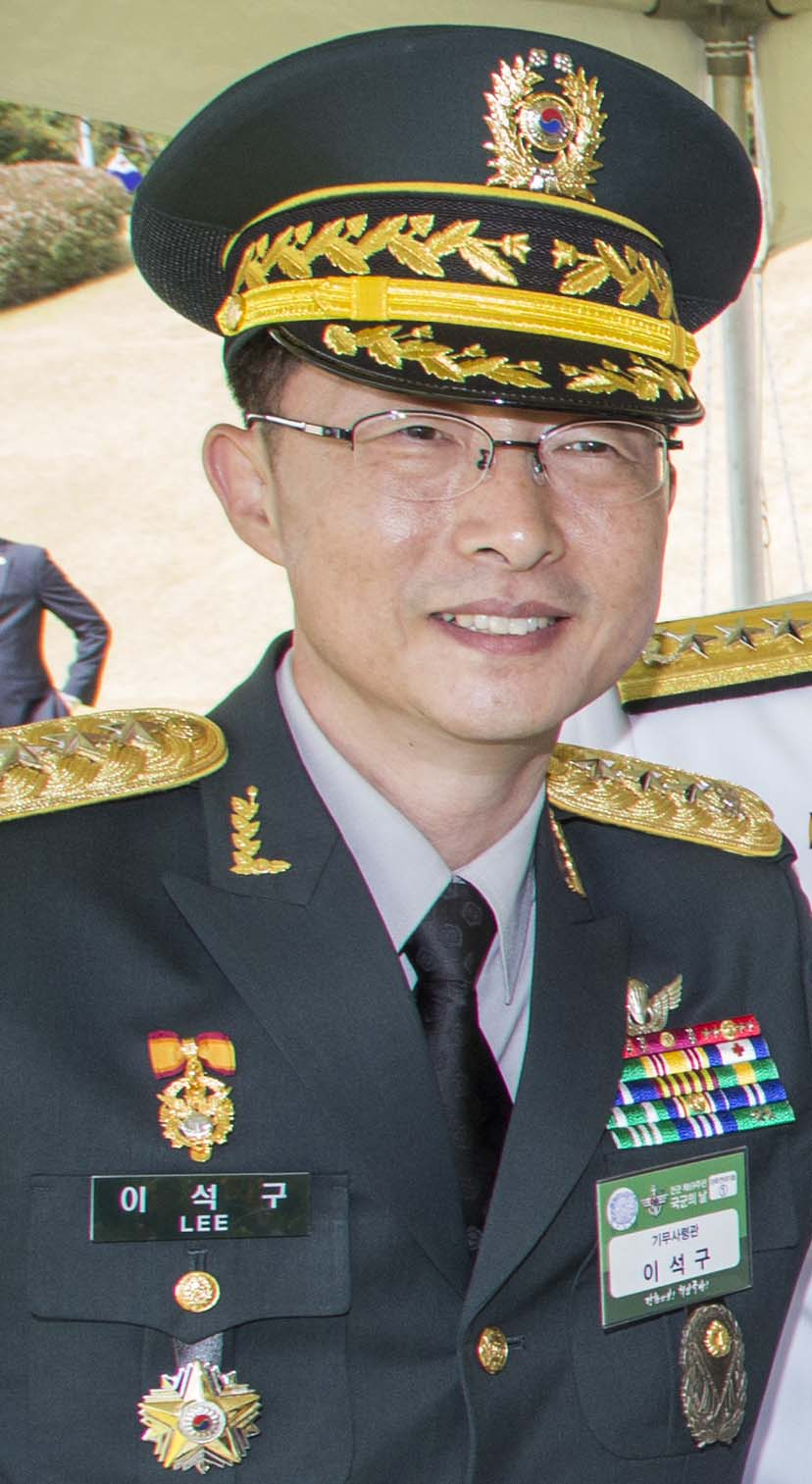
Army Peaked Cap

Navy Peaked Cap

Marine Corps Peaked Cap

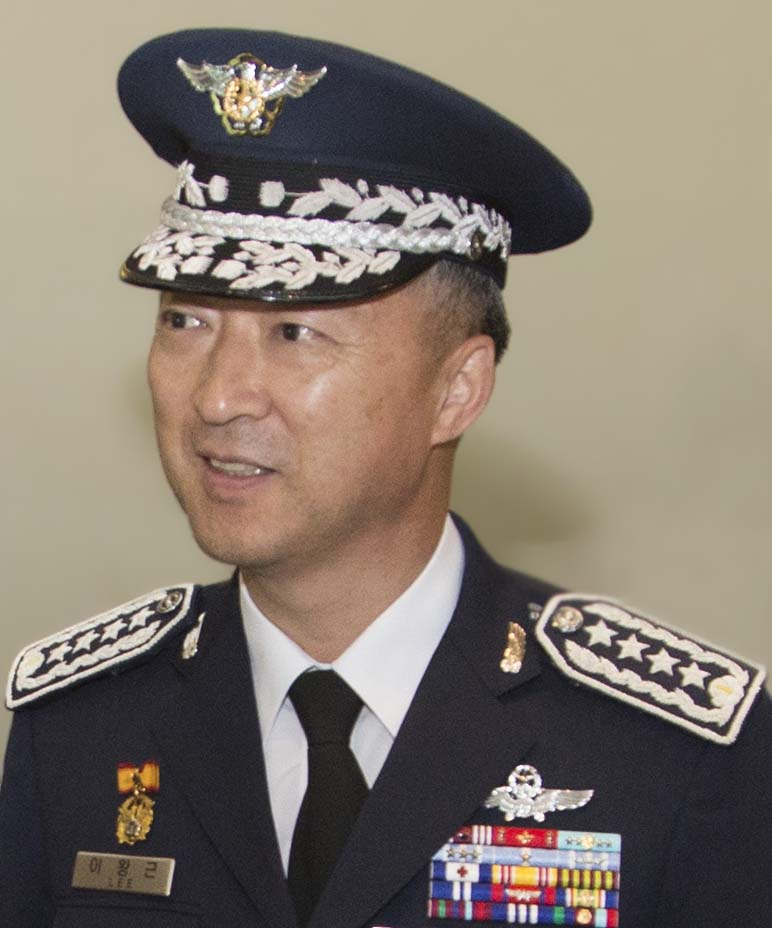
Air Force Peaked Cap

Beret

Side Cap

Armed Forces Integrated Combat cap

Marine Corps Utility cap

Sailor cap

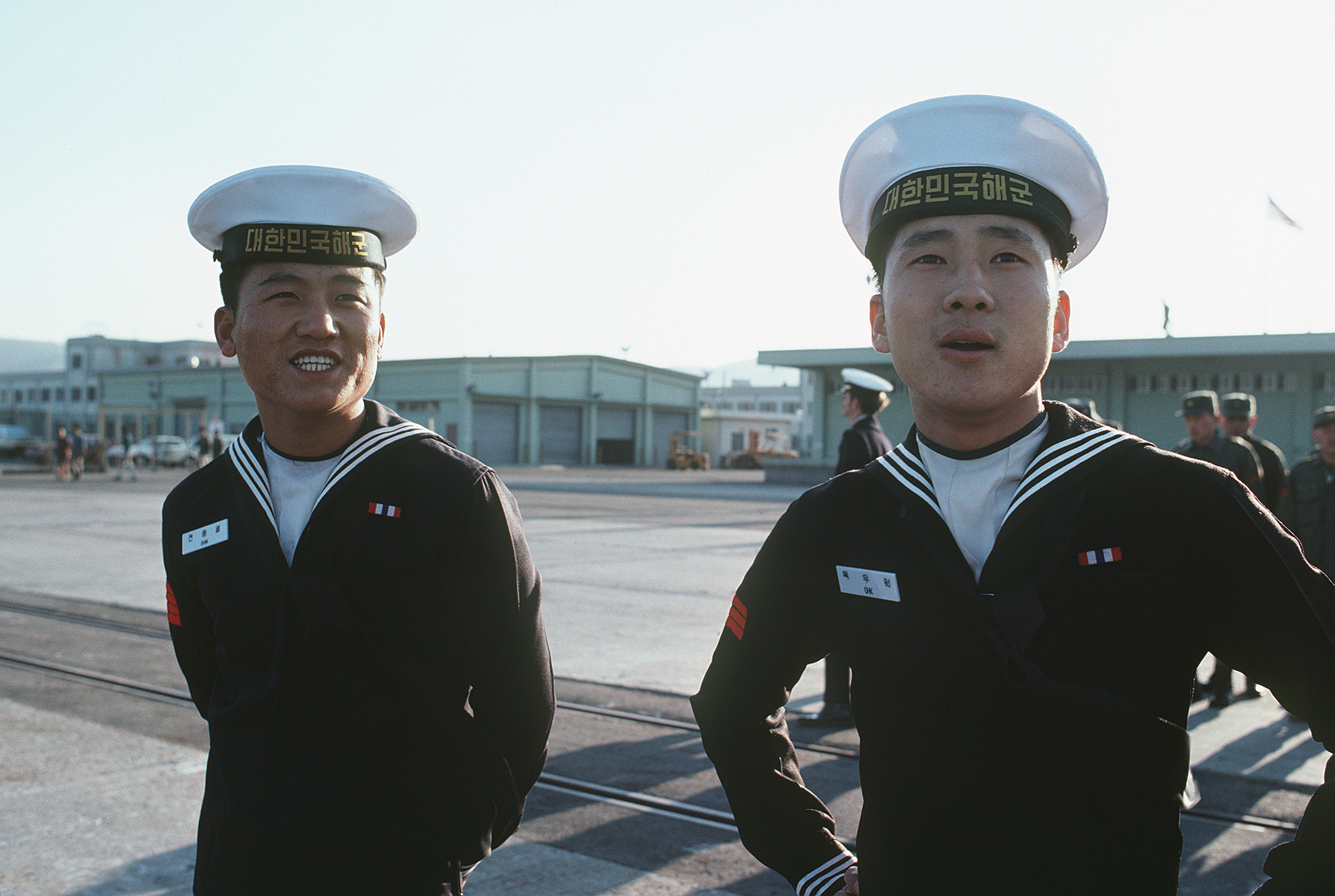
Sailor cap (petty officer)

Headgear of Republic of Korea Armed Forces

Military Police (Army, Navy, Marine Corps & Air Force) uniform

Various Dress Uniform of Navy and Air Force (in the back seat) Military Uniform of Navy (front seat)

Air Force Technician Uniform

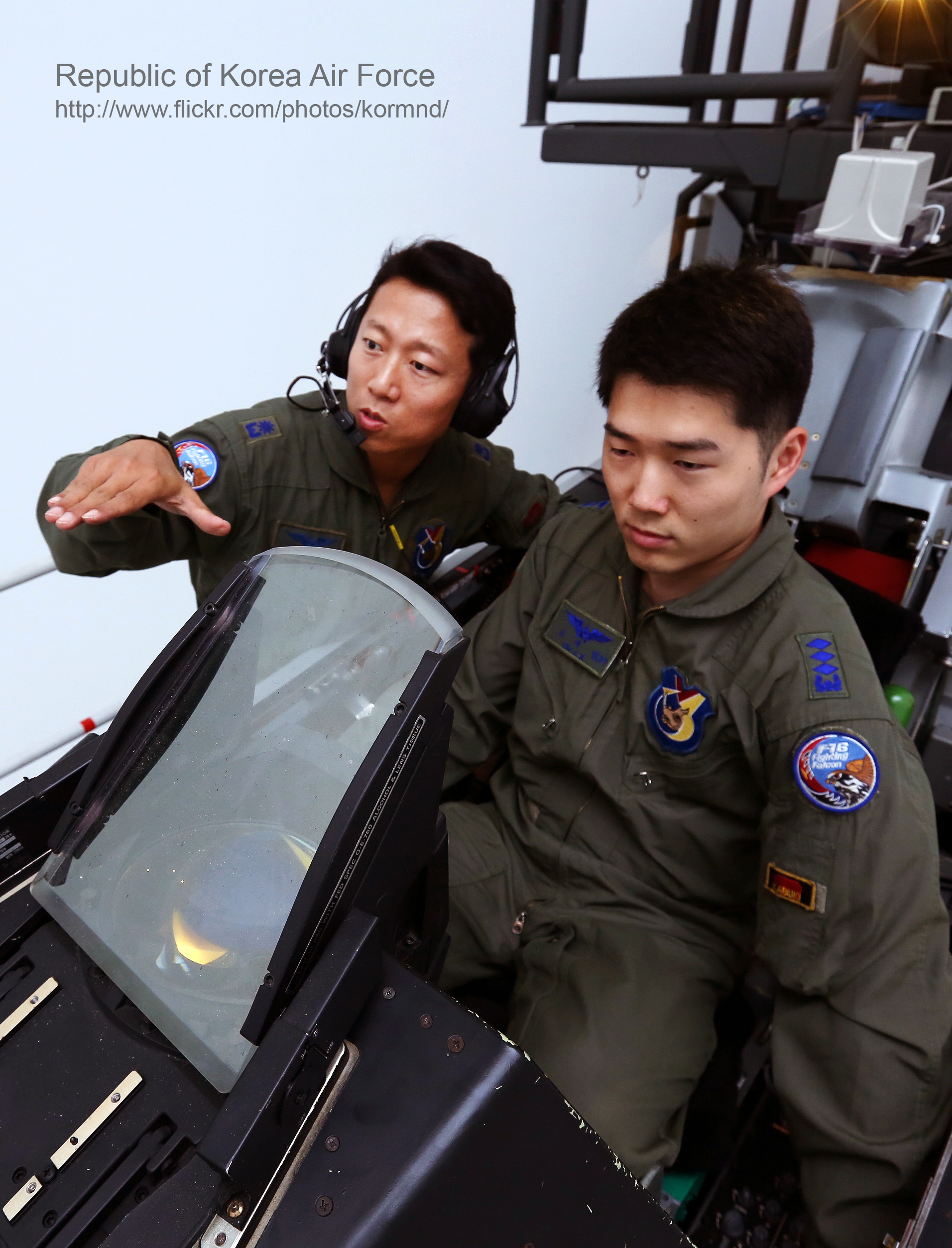
Air Force Flight Uniform

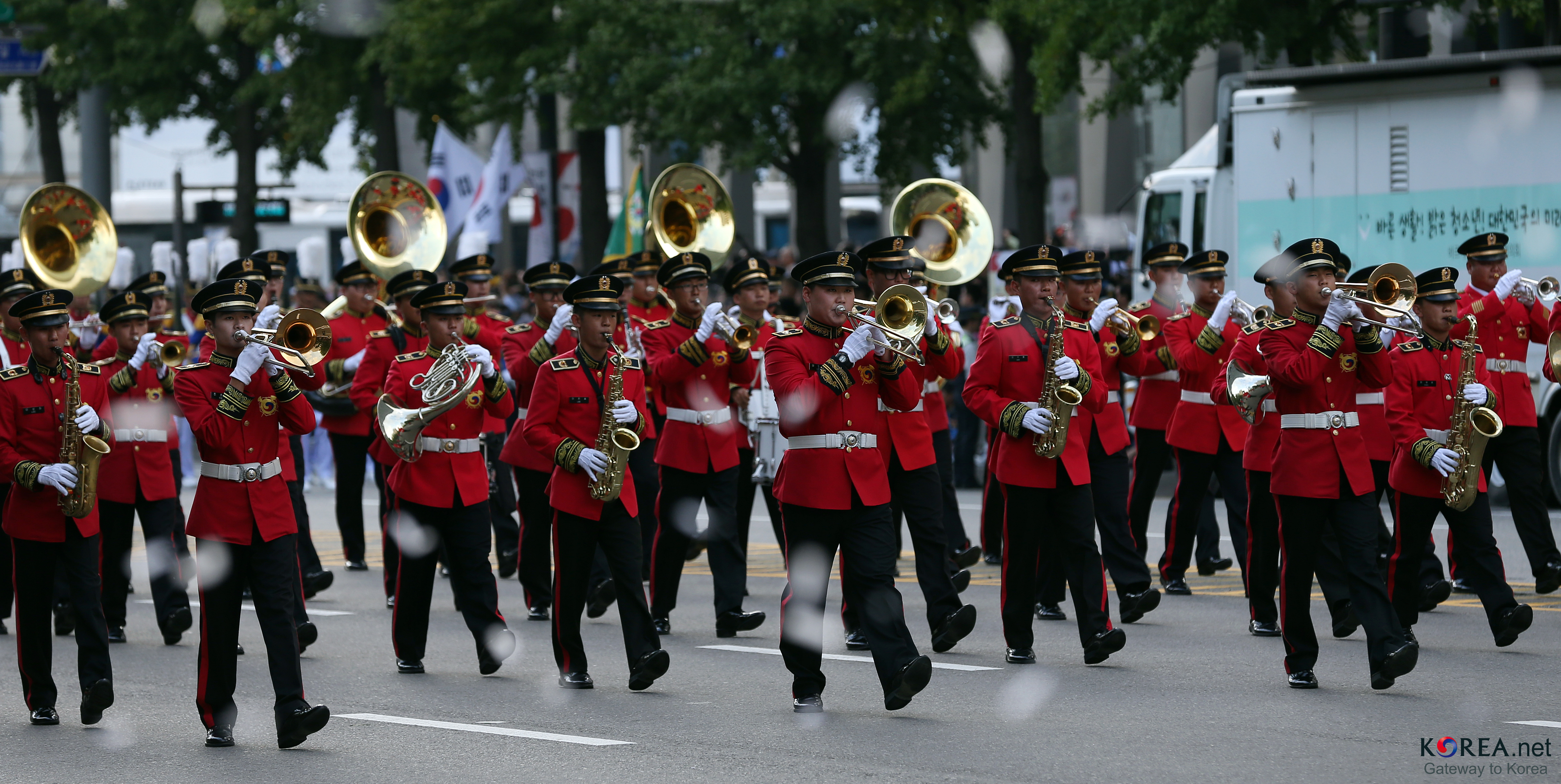
Army Band Corps uniform

Armed Forces Nurse Academy uniform

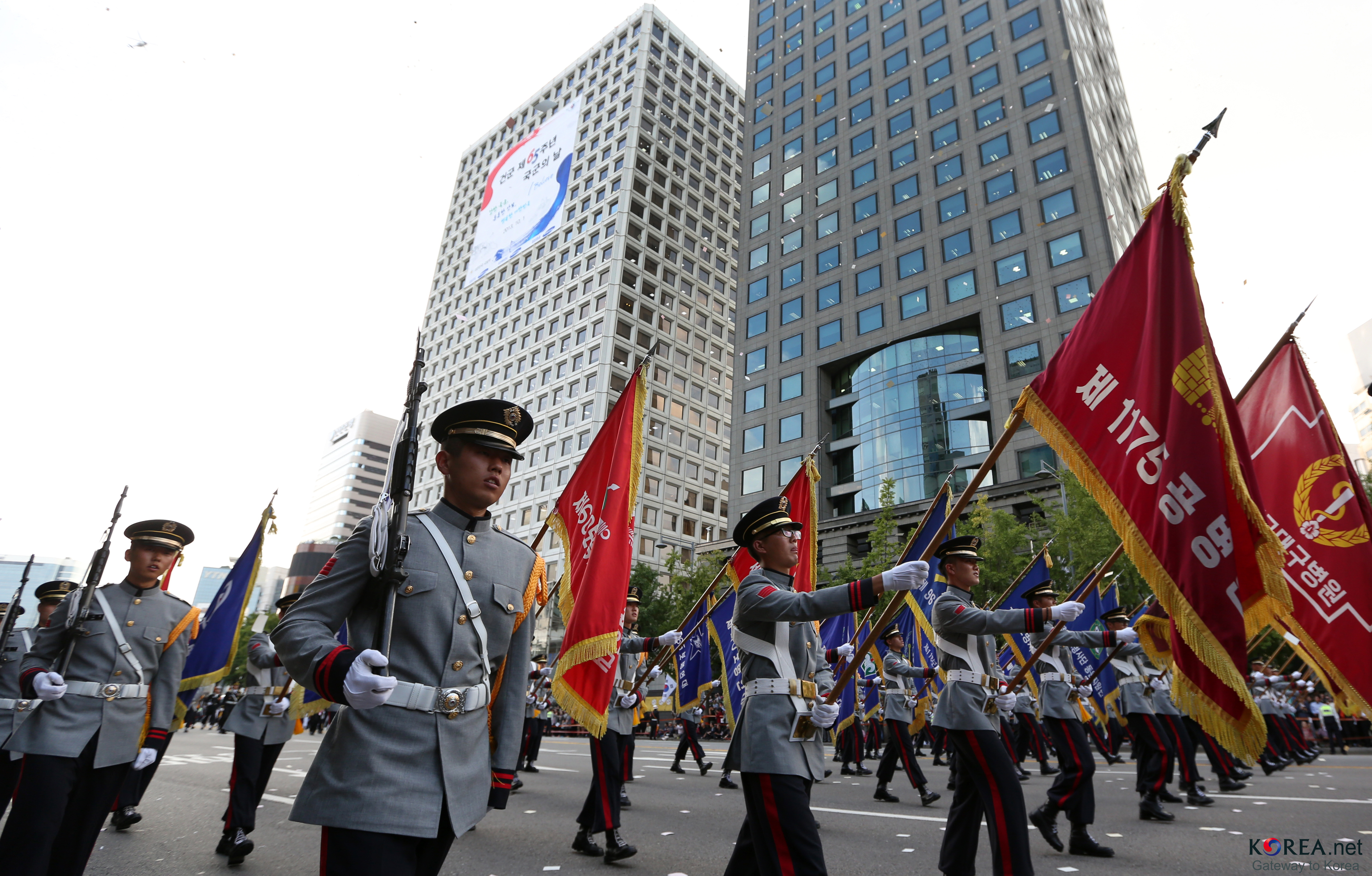
Army Honor Guard Uniform

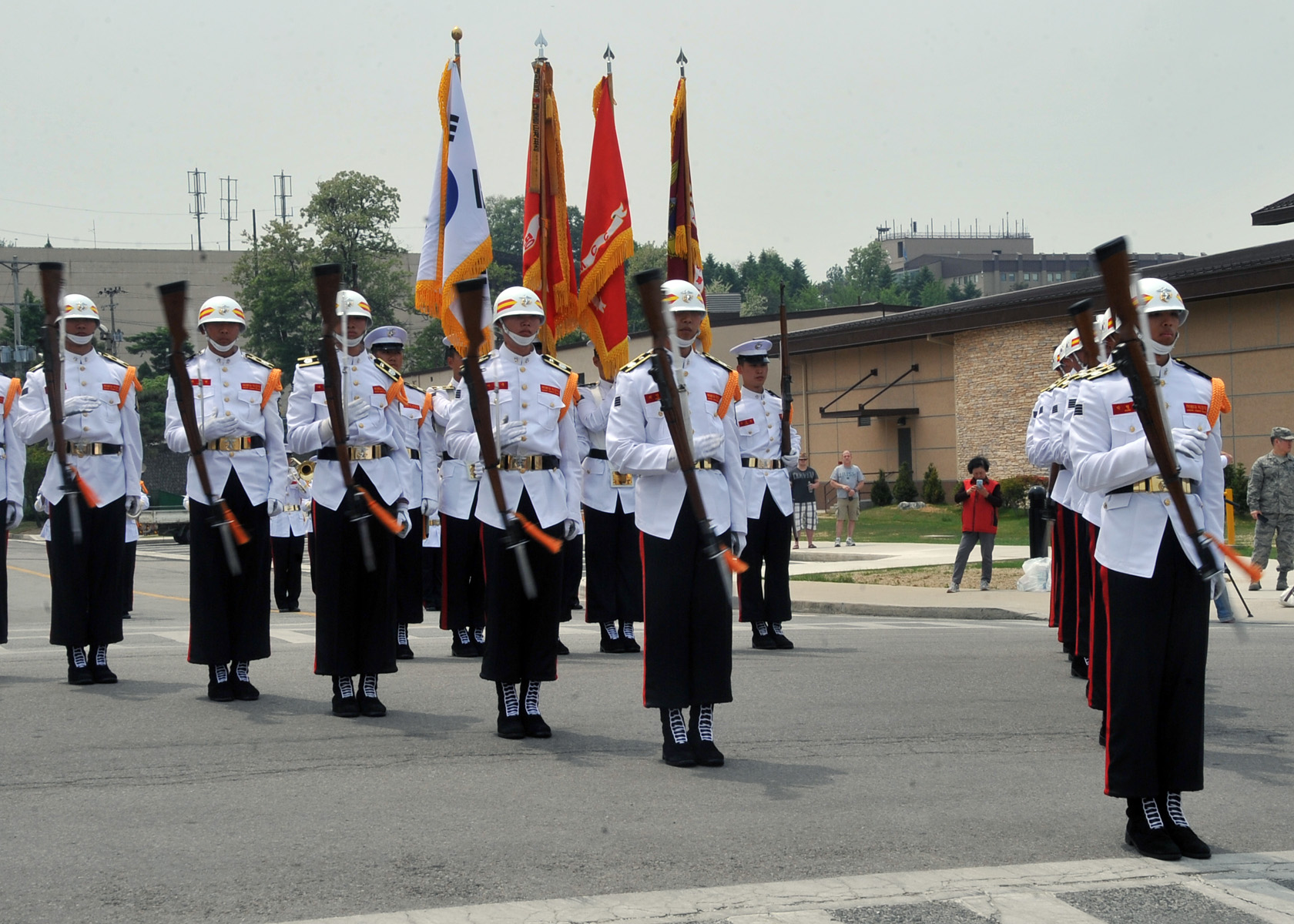
Marine Corps Honor Guard Uniform

Navy Honor Guard Uniform (Winter)

Air Force Honor Guard Uniform

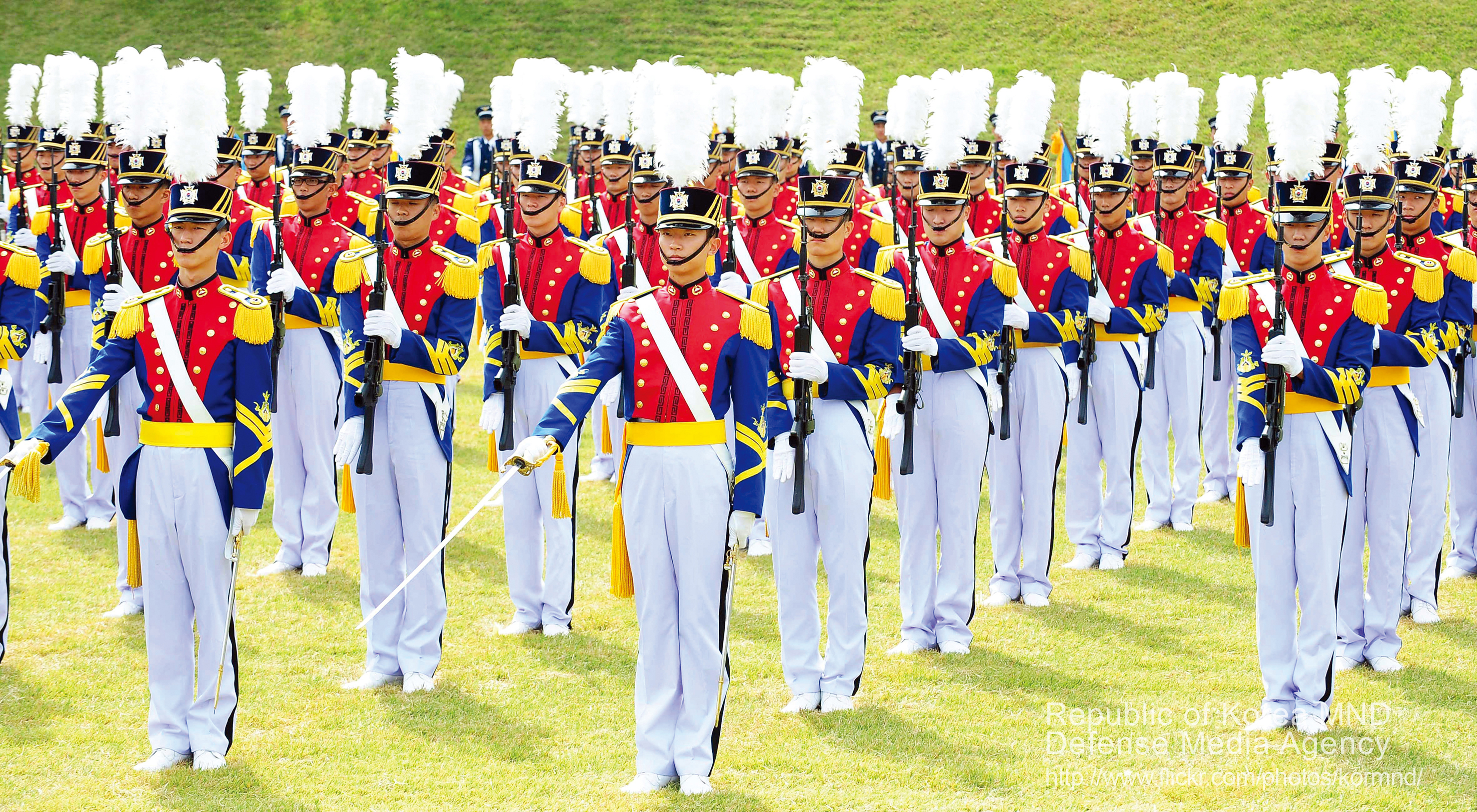
ROKA Military Academy uniform

ROKN Naval Academy uniform

ROKAF Air Force Academy uniform

Korea Army 3rd Academy uniform

Infantry Gears
Name	Type	Images	In Service/Notes
M1	Combat Helmet		In Storage.
Bangtan Helmet	Combat Helmet		Training and Reserve purpose only.
KHB-2000	Combat Helmet		Large Amount.
KHB Type III KCI-105	Combat Helmet		Currently Standard issue combat helmet, alongside with KHB-2000
FAST-Style (Lightweight bulletproof helmet)	Combat Helmet		Used by Special Operation Force.
KH-80A1	Crewman helmet		Standard issue Crewman Helmet for Main battle tank and Armored Fighting Vehicle Crewman.
PASGT-Type	Body Armor		Phased out.
CIRAS	Tactical vest		Small number, used by the Dongmyeong Unit (Contingent of ROK Army for UN Mission on Lebanon), Zaytun Unit (Contingent in UAE, Air Force, and Marine Corps.
OTV body armor	Bulletproof vest		Starting in 2010, developed for supply to the Special Operation Forces.
Multipurpose Bulletproof Vest (Type I)	Bulletproof vest		Currently used by Army, Marine Corps. More than 300,000 pieces have been supplied.
Scalable Plate Carrier-style (Type III Body Armor)	Plate Carrier		Newly plate carrier, issued by some unit.
M-1945 Combat Pack	Load-carrying equipment		Phased out
M-1956 LCE	Load-carrying equipment		Limited use
Combat Vest	Load-bearing vest		Widely used.

== Army & Marine Corps ==
ROK Marine Corps members aiming their K15 light machine gun

ROK Army personnel aiming his K2C1 assault rifle

=== Rifles & SMG ===
- Daewoo K1A Assault Carbine
- Daewoo K2 Assault Rifle (K2 & K2C1)
- Daewoo K7 Silencer-Mounted SMG
- Daewoo K11 Advanced Assault Rifle and Air-Burst Smart Grenade Launcher (rejected)
- Heckler & Koch MP5
- Heckler & Koch HK416
- Colt M4A1
- Colt M16A1 (in use with reserve forces)
- MAC-11 (in storage)
- AK-47 (Type 56 & Type 58)
- PPSh-41
- Thompson M1A1 (in storage)
- M1A1 Carbine (in storage)
- M1 Garand (used as a ceremonial gun)
- M1918 BAR (in storage)
- M1903 Springfield (in storage)
- M3 submachine gun (in storage)

=== Pistols ===
- Daewoo K5
- IMI Jericho 941F Tactical
- Heckler & Koch USP9 Tactical
- Beretta 92FS
- Glock 17

=== Shotguns ===
- Remington 870
- Daewoo USAS-12
- Mossberg 500
- Benelli M4 Super 90

=== Machine guns/Support weapons ===
- Daewoo K15 Light Machine Gun
- Daewoo K4 40mm Automatic Grenade Launcher
- Daewoo K11 Advanced Assault Rifle and Air-Burst Smart Grenade Launcher (rejected)
- S&T Daewoo K12 General-Purpose Machine Gun
- S&T Daewoo K6 Heavy Machine Gun
- M60D General-Purpose Machine Gun

=== Sniper rifles ===
- Heckler & Koch PSG-1
- Heckler & Koch MSG-90
- Steyr SSG 69
- SIG Sauer SSG 3000
- Accuracy International AWM
- S&T Daewoo K14

=== Anti-tank munitions ===
- BGM-71 TOW
- Panzerfaust 3
- AT-13 Metis-M
- M72 LAW
- M40 106mm recoilless rifle
- KSTAM
- RPG-7

=== Tanks ===
- K1(K1E1) & K1A1(K1A2) MBTs
- K2 Black Panther MBT
- T-80U & T-80UK
- T-72

=== Armored vehicles ===
- M113
- K200 & K200A1 series
- BMP-3
- K532
- KM900
- Doosan Barracuda
- K21 KNIFV
- KAAV7A1
- K808(8X8) & K806(6X6) wheeled armored vehicle in 2016

=== Artillery ===
- M101 105mm Howitzer
- KH178 105mm Howitzer
- KH179 155mm Howitzer
- M114 155mm Howitzer
- M115 203mm Howitzer
- M107 175mm SP Howitzer
- M110 203mm SP Howitzer
- K55 155mm SP Howitzer
- K9 Thunder 155mm SP Howitzer
- K10 Artillery Munitions Carrier
- M270A1 MLRS
- K-136 Kooryong MRLS

=== Surface-to-Surface Missile ===
- Hyunmoo Hyunmoo I SSM(185 km ~ 250 km) / Hyunmoo II SSM(300 km ~ 500 km) / Hyunmoo III SLCM(1000 km ~ 1500 km)
- ATACMS

=== Self-propelled anti-aircraft vehicles ===
- K30 Biho SPAAG
- K263A1

The K-SAM Pegasus is categorized under "Missile"

=== Aviation ===
- AH-64E
- AH-1S
- AH-1F
- CH-47D
- UH-60P
- UH-1
- Hughes 500MD
- Bo 105
- Surion

=== Unmanned aerial vehicle (UAV) ===
- IAI Searcher
- KAI Duck Hawk (KRQ-101 Night Intruder 300)
- KAI Kus-9
- IAI Heron-1

=== Support vehicles ===
- KM451 Ambulance Vehicle
- KM450 Utility Truck
- DoDaam Aegis Robot
- RXV Unmanned Vehicle
- KM131 Jeep
- KM250 Cargo Truck
- KM1500 heavy truck

== Navy ==
=== Rifles & SMGs ===
- Heckler & Koch HK416
- Heckler & Koch MP5
- Daewoo K1A
- Daewoo K2
- SNT Motiv K13 (recalled or withdrawn from service)
- AK-47
- PPSh-41

=== Pistols ===
- Daewoo K5
- IMI Jericho 941F Tactical
- Beretta 92FS
- Heckler & Koch USP9 Tactical
- SIG Sauer P226

=== Machine Guns ===
- Daewoo K15
- Daewoo K6

=== Sniper Rifles ===
- KAC SR-25

=== Submarines ===
- SX 756 Dolgorae ("Dolphin")-class submarine
- KSS-I Changbogo class (U209) submarine
- KSS-II Sohn Won-il class (U214) submarine
- KSS-III

=== Destroyers ===
- Gwanggaeto the Great class destroyer (KD-I)
- Chungmugong Yi Sunshin class destroyer (KD-II)
- King Sejong the Great class destroyer (KDX-III)

=== Frigates ===
- Ulsan-class frigate
- Inchon class frigate

=== Corvettes ===
- Donghae class PCC
- Pohang class PCC

=== Missile craft ===
- Pae Ku-52
- Pae Ku-51

=== Patrol craft ===
- Sea Dolphin/Kiruki-class
- PKM Chamsuri class
- PK-X Gumdoksuri class

=== Mine warfare ships ===
- Wonsan class MLS
- Yang-yang class MSH
- Ganggyeong class MHC
- Geumsan (aka Kum San) class MSC (ex-USN MSC-268 class)
- Nam-yang class MSC (ex-USN MSC-294 class)

=== Amphibious ===
- Dokdo class LPH
- Gojoonbong class LST
- LCM
- LCU-72 Mulkae
- LSM-655 Ko Mun
- Hovercraft

=== Support ships ===
- Cheonji class AOE (Combat Auxiliary Support Ships)
- Cheonghaejin class ASR (Submarine rescue ship)
- Pyeongtaek class ATS (ex-USN Edenton class)

=== Aviation ===
- P-3C
- Bell 206 JetRanger
- Cessna F406
- Hughes 500MD
- Aérospatiale SA 316
- Westland Lynx
- Super Lynx Mk.99
- UH-60
- RC-800
- Lockheed Martin F-35 Lightning II

=== Anti-ship/Cruise missiles ===
- Sea Skua
- SSM-700K Sea Star (Hae Sung)
- AGM-119 Penguin
- Harpoon, Harpoon Block II
- MM38 Exocet

=== Land Attack Cruise missile ===
- Hyunmoo III

=== Ship-to-Air Missile ===
- RIM-7 Sea Sparrow
- RIM-116 RAM
- RIM-66 Standard

=== Torpedo/Anti-submarine ===
- Hong Sang Eo (Red Shark) rocket-based torpedo (K-ASROC)
- K745 LW Blue Shark torpedo
- K731 HW White Shark torpedo
- Mark 46 torpedo
- SUT

== Air Force ==
=== Rifles & SMGs + Machine gun ===
- Heckler & Koch HK416
- Heckler & Koch MP5
- Daewoo K1A
- Daewoo K2 (K2 & K2C1)
- M-60 machine gun

=== Pistols ===
- Daewoo K5
- IMI Jericho 941F Tactical
- Beretta 92FS
- Heckler & Koch USP9 Tactical
- SIG Sauer P226
- M1911A1

=== Fighter aircraft ===
- F-4D/E Phantom II (retired)
- F-5E/F Tiger II (will be phased out)
- F-16C/D & KF-16C/D
- F-15K Slam Eagle
- FA-50 Golden Eagle
- A-37B (retired)
- Lockheed Martin F-35 Lightning II
- KFX (In Development)

=== Support aircraft ===
- C-130 Hercules
- CN-235
- BAe 748
- Boeing 737-3Z8
- Hawker 800XP

=== Trainers ===
- KT-1
- T-50 Golden Eagle
- BAE HAWK 67 MK
- KO-1

=== Helicopters ===
- UH-1H
- CH-47D
- AH-1
- Aérospatiale AS 332
- VH/HH-60
- Ka-32
- Surion
- Korean Multi-purpose Helicopter ("KMH") (in development)
- Bell 427 Helicopter (Co-developed by KAI and Bell)
- AH-64 Apache

=== Unmanned aerial vehicle (UAV) ===
- IAI Harpy

== Special Forces Small Arms ==
=== Rifles and Carbines ===
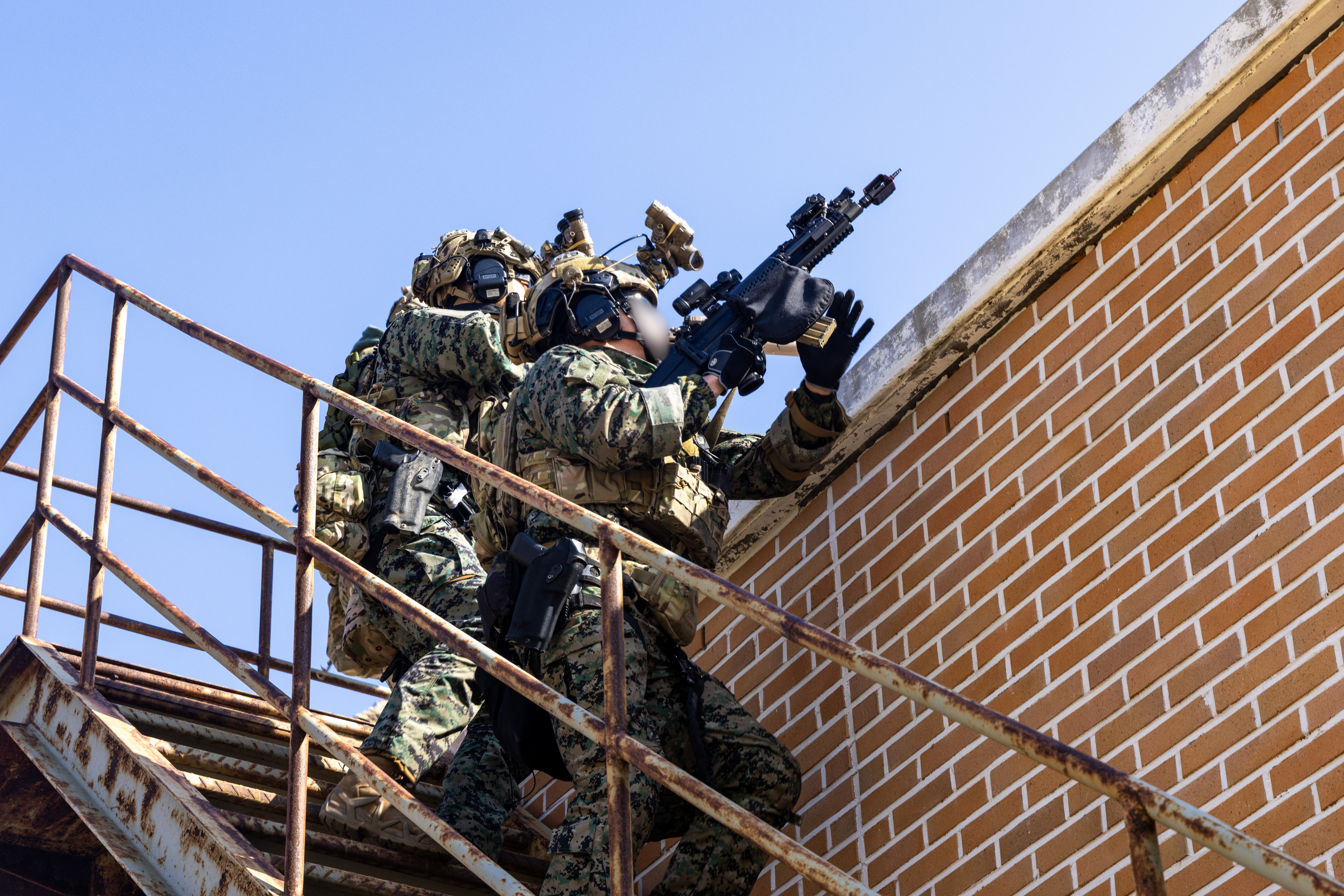
Special Operation Force FN SCAR during Freedom Shield Exercise 2025

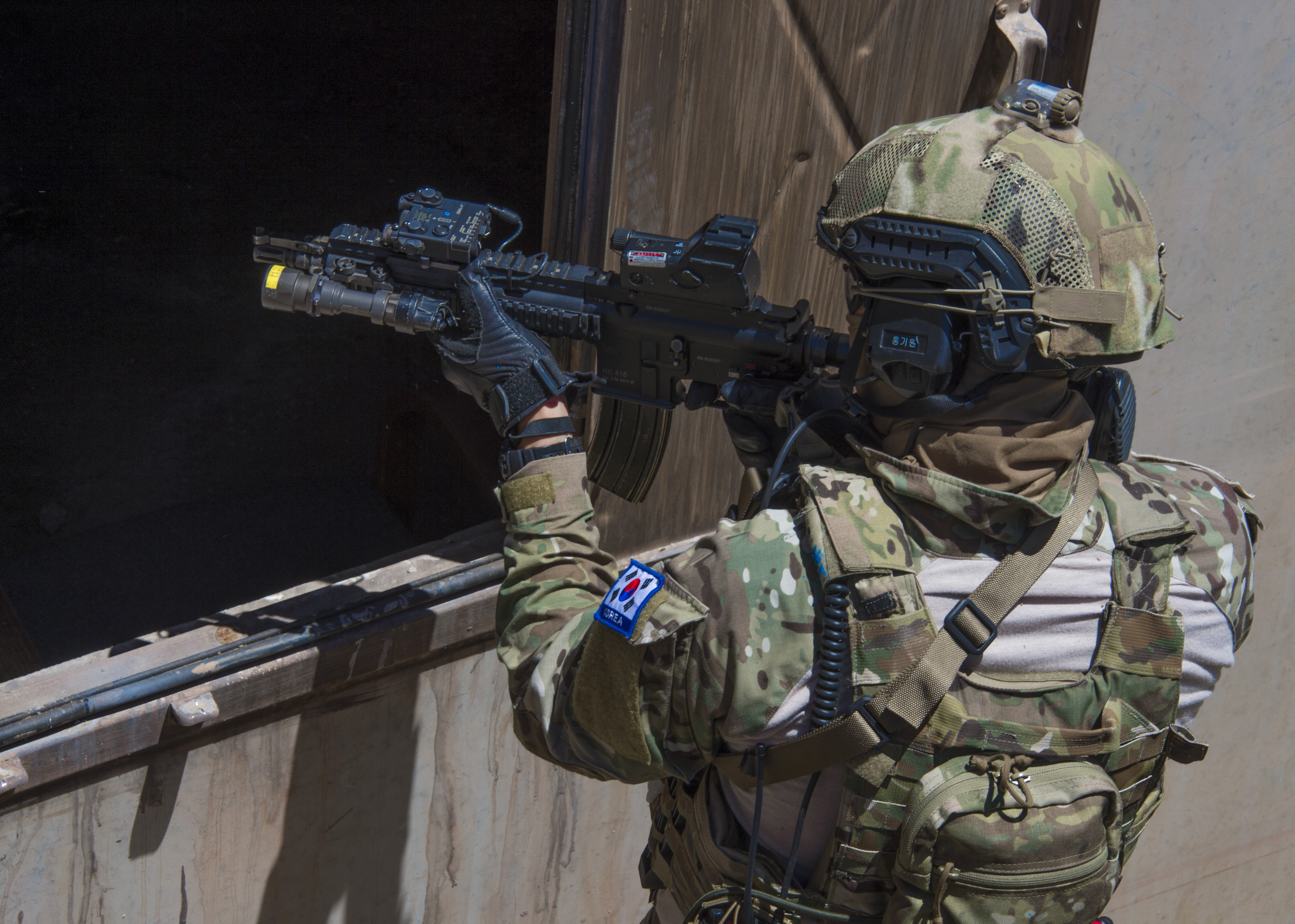
Navy HK416 at RIMPAC Exercise 2014.

- Heckler & Koch HK416 (In use mainly with the UDT/SEALs)
- Colt M4A1
- SNT Motiv K13 (recalled or withdrawn from service)
- SNT Motiv K17
- Daewoo K1
- Daewoo K2 (K2C carbine ready for distribution and is in field testing)
- Daewoo K11 (rejected)
- FN SCAR-L

=== SMGs ===
- Daewoo K-7
- Heckler & Koch MP5 (MP5SD, MP5N, MP5A2)
- Heckler & Koch MP7 (In use with 707 Special Mission Battalion)
- Brügger & Thomet MP9 (In use with 707 Special Mission Battalion)

=== Pistols ===
- Heckler & Koch USP (In .45 ACP)
- Daewoo K5 (Standard sidearm)
- Beretta 92FS
- IMI Jericho 941F Tactical
- SIG Sauer P226 (in use mainly with the Navy)
- Various revolvers (in use mainly with JSA personnel)
- M1911A1
- Glock 17/19

=== Sniper Rifles ===
- Heckler & Koch MSG-90
- Heckler & Koch PSG-1
- Steyr SSG 69
- SIG Sauer SSG 3000
- Accuracy International Arctic Warfare Magnum
- Barrett M82
- Barrett MRAD
- S&T Daewoo K14
- KAC SR-25

== Missile ==
=== Anti-air systems ===
- M167 Vulcan
- GDF-001 35mm AAA
- K-SAM Pegasus
- MIM-14 Nike-Hercules
- MIM-104C PAC-2, 3
- Javelin
- MIM-23 Hawk
- FIM-92A Stinger ATAS
- Mistral
- KP-SAM Shingung
- SA-16 Igla
- SA-18 Grouse
- RIM-7 Sea Sparrow
- KM-SAM
- RIM-116 RAM
- RIM-66 Standard SM-2
- K-SAAM

=== Ballistic missiles ===
- Baekgom
- Hyunmoo-1, 2, 4
- Honest John
- ATACMS

=== Surface attack munitions ===
- AGM-65 Maverick
- AGM-88 HARM
- AGM-84K SLAM-ER
- AGM-142 Have Nap
- JDAM
- KEPD 350
- AGM-130
- Mark 84
- Paveway(All variants)
- CBU-58
- CBU-87
- CBU-97
- LAU-3
- LAU-68
- Hyunmoo-3

=== Air-to-air munitions ===
- AIM-120 AMRAAM
- AIM-9
- AIM-7

== See also ==
- Military of South Korea
- Republic of Korea Air Force
- Republic of Korea Army Special Warfare Command
- 707th Special Mission Unit
