= 1st Commando Brigade =

1st Commando Brigade may refer to:

- 1st Commando Brigade (Turkey)
- 1st Raider–Paratrooper Brigade, Greece
- 1st Special Forces Brigade, South Korea
- 1st Special Service Brigade, United Kingdom

== See also ==
- 1st Brigade (disambiguation)
