= International Peace Supporting Standby Force =

Unit of the Republic of Korea Army

- Unit Insignia of Onnuri Unit
- Active: July 10, 2010 ~ now
- Country: South Korea; Republic of Korea Army
- Branch: Special forces
- Role: Peacekeeping in overseas deployment area & training personnel for dispatch
- Size: Brigade
- Part of: Republic of Korea Army Special Warfare Command
- Garrison/HQ: Hyoseong-dong, Gyeyang District, Incheon, Republic of Korea
- Nickname(s): Onnuri (kor: 온누리)
- Engagements: UN Peace Keeping Operations (PKO) or multinational Peace Keeping Force (PKF) missions

Commanders
- Current commander: Brigadier general of ROK Army

International Peace Supporting Standby Force (Korean: 국제 평화 지원단) or Onnuri Unit (Korean: 온누리 부대) is a unit belonging to Republic of Korea Army Special Warfare Command, reorganized from preexisting ROKA Special Warfare Command 5th Special Forces brigade (a.k.a. Black Dragon unit), to ensure Republic of Korea's participation in international peace keeping operations. Deployed overseas, Onnuri Unit carries out UN Peace Keeping Operations (PKO) or multinational Peace Keeping Force (PKF) missions and instructs its troops in local languages and customs. Unit's name, 'On' means 'whole' and 'Nuri' means 'the world'. In other words, the name 'Onnuri' represents the unit that goes around the whole world performing its tasks.

The parent unit was 5th Special Forces brigade which was reorganized into Special Missions Group in June 2000 and was again into International Peace Supporting Standby Force in July 2010, becoming a current specialized unit for overseas deployment. During the 5th Special Forces brigade period and as of today the commanding officer is brigadier general, but it was colonel only during the Special Missions Group period.

== See also ==
- Republic of Korea Army Special Warfare Command
