= 3rd Armoured Brigade =

3rd Armoured Brigade may refer to:

- 3rd Armored Brigade (People's Republic of China)
- 3rd Armored Brigade (South Korea)
- 3rd Armoured Brigade (United Kingdom)
- 3rd Army Tank Brigade, Australia
- 3rd Light Armoured Brigade, France
- 3rd Brigade Combat Team, 1st Armored Division

== See also ==
- 3rd Brigade (disambiguation)
- 3rd Motor Brigade (disambiguation)
