= Special Forces Brigades of the Republic of Korea Army =

Units of the Republic of Korea Army

The Special Forces Brigades of the Republic of Korea (ROK) are six special forces brigades and one oversea deployment group under the command and control of the Republic of Korea Army Special Warfare Command (ROK-SWC; Korean: 대한민국 육군 특수전사령부, 특전사; Hanja: 大韓民國陸軍 特殊戰司令部). These units were modelled after United States Army Special Forces (Green Berets).

Members of the brigades receive special training for various unconventional warfare missions. These seven units are part of ROK Special Forces, founded in 1958 and fall under the jurisdiction of the Republic of Korea Army Special Warfare Command, which was created in 1969. ROK special forces brigades main tasks include guerrilla warfare, special reconnaissance, unconventional warfare, direct action, collecting information in enemy territory and conducting special missions. They were reportedly deployed to the streets of Seoul in December 2024 amidst the declaration of martial law.

Republic of Korea Army Special Warfare Command

== Relationship with SOCKOR ==
The members of the ROK Special Forces Brigades train and work in close partnership with members of the United States Special Operations Forces in defense of the Republic of Korea. U.S. SOF in Korea are under the command and control of Special Operations Command Korea (SOCKOR) which is a sub-unified command assigned under the Combatant Command (COCOM) of United States Special Operations Command (USSOCOM) and further delegated to the Operational Command of the United States Forces Korea (USFK) Commander.

== Special Forces Brigades ==
Volunteers for these brigades undergo training in high skilled weapon handling and parachuting as well as the regular physical and psychological tests. All weapons and equipment used by the ROK special forces are South Korean, British, U.S., German, and others products. Although ROK Special Forces Brigades consist purely of volunteer soldiers, they have to reach certain requirements such as achieving a black belt in Taekwondo or any similar martial art. Battalions of ROK Special Forces Brigades are frequently used for destruction of tactical targets. Normal uniform is a camouflage combat suit and ROK Special Forces distinguish icon are their black berets with the SF badge in silver. The usual distribution of the ROK Special Forces Brigades is one battalion per each Army corps and each unit is capable of using either continuous guerrilla operations or single operations, whether or not they find themselves on friendly or enemy territory.

Each of the seven ROK Special Forces Brigades have their own mascot. They are:

1. 1st Special Forces Brigade (Airborne) 'Eagle'
2. 3rd Special Forces Brigade (Airborne) 'Flying Tiger'
3. International Peace Supporting Standby Force (Formerly 5th Special Forces Brigade (Airborne) and 5th Special Mission Group 'Black Dragon')
4. 7th Special Forces Brigade (Airborne) 'Pegasus'
5. 9th Special Forces Brigade (Airborne) 'Ghost'
6. 11th Special Forces Brigade (Airborne) 'Golden Bat'
7. 13th Special Mission Brigade (Black Panther) (Formerly 13th Special Forces Brigade (Airborne))

=== 1st Special Forces Brigade (Airborne) ===
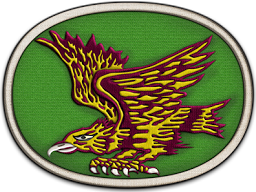
Insignia of the 1st Special Forces Brigade (Airborne)

1st Special Forces Brigade was founded on April 1, 1958, under the name of 1st Combat Group. This was the original unit of the ROK Special Forces. In October 1958, it adopted the name of 1st Special Forces Group. And in September 1972 it became 1st Special Forces Brigade. The former commander of the 1st Special Forces Brigade, Chun Doo Hwan, served as President of Korea from 1980 to 1988. Its special pocket patch emblem is the Eagle.

=== 3rd Special Forces Brigade (Airborne) ===
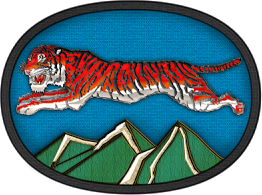
Insignia of the 3rd Special Forces Brigade (Airborne)

Founded on January 18, 1969, under the name of 1st Ranger Brigade. On September 10, 1972, it adopted the name of 3rd Special Forces Brigade. It is well known among the other brigades for its excellence in Tae Kwon Do. Its special pocket patch emblem is the Flying Tiger.

=== International Peace Supporting Standby Force ===
Founded on February 17, 1969, under the name of 2nd Ranger Brigade. On September 10, 1972, it was re-designated to 5th Special Forces Brigade. And in 2000 it adopted the name of Special Missions Group. Its special pocket patch emblem is the Black Dragon. In 2010, it became International Peace Supporting Standby Force (Korean: 국제평화지원단). The unit consists of around 1,000 members, and carries out overseas development missions.

=== 7th Special Forces Brigade (Airborne) ===
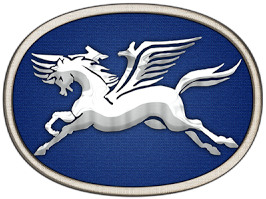
Insignia of the 7th Special Forces Brigade (Airborne)

Founded on October 1, 1974. This unit is known for its HALO Jumping abilities. The 7th Special Forces Brigade maintains one of the only usable year-round Drop Zone. Its special pocket patch emblem is the Flying Horse or Pegasus.

=== 9th Special Forces Brigade (Airborne) ===
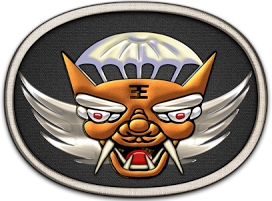
Insignia of the 9th Special Forces Brigade (Airborne)

Founded on October 1, 1974, along with the 7th Special Forces Brigade. One former 9th special Forces Brigade Commander, Roh Tae-woo, served as President of the Republic of Korea from 1987 to 1992. Its special pocket patch emblem is the Ghost.

=== 11th Special Forces Brigade (Airborne) ===
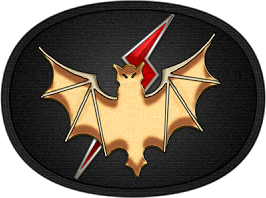
Insignia of the 11th Special Forces Brigade (Airborne)

Founded on October 1, 1977. Its special pocket patch emblem is the Golden Bat.

=== 13th Special Mission Brigade ===
The 13th Special Forces Brigade was founded in July 1977 along with the 11th Special Forces Brigade. Its special pocket patch emblem is the Black Panther.

On 1 December 2017, the 13th Special Mission Brigade was reorganized into the 13th Special Mission Brigade. It was formerly known as "The Decapitation Unit" (참수부대), as unlike the other Korean Special Forces Brigades in addition to conducting unconventional warfare in enemy territory, it is tasked with neutralizing well-protected, high-priority targets such as political and military leaders and facilities. It is regarded as having the most intensive training regimen out of all the Korean Special Forces Brigades, holding regular joint training sessions with US Navy SEALs and Green Berets, and is the only Korean Special Forces unit to still use conscripted troops in combat roles and training.

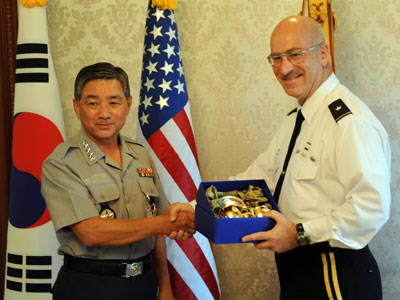
US Army 51006 ROK, U.S. hold first ever Army-to-Army staff talks

== 707th Special Mission Group ==
Founded late in 1981 under the Executive Order of the President of the Republic of Korea as world-class Counter-terrorist force with the goal to support Domestic and International Counter-terrorist agencies. The hostage-taking situation of the 1972 Summer Olympics was key for the development of such unit in which Palestinian guerrillas belonging to the Black September organization took eleven Israeli athletes as hostages. The members from 707th Special Mission Group are distinguished from other soldiers by their unique black berets. All operators of the 707th receive a full year of special training; six months of basic infantry combat skills and another six months of special warfare training. Every member of the 707th is SCUBA and parachute qualified.

== See also ==
- Commandos of the Republic of Korea Army
- Republic of Korea Army Special Warfare Command
- Republic of Korea Naval Special Warfare Flotilla
- List of military equipment of Republic of Korea
- Special Operations Command Korea
- United States Army Special Forces
