= Hanbit Unit =

South Korean peacekeeping unit

Hanbit Unit banner

Hanbit Unit logo

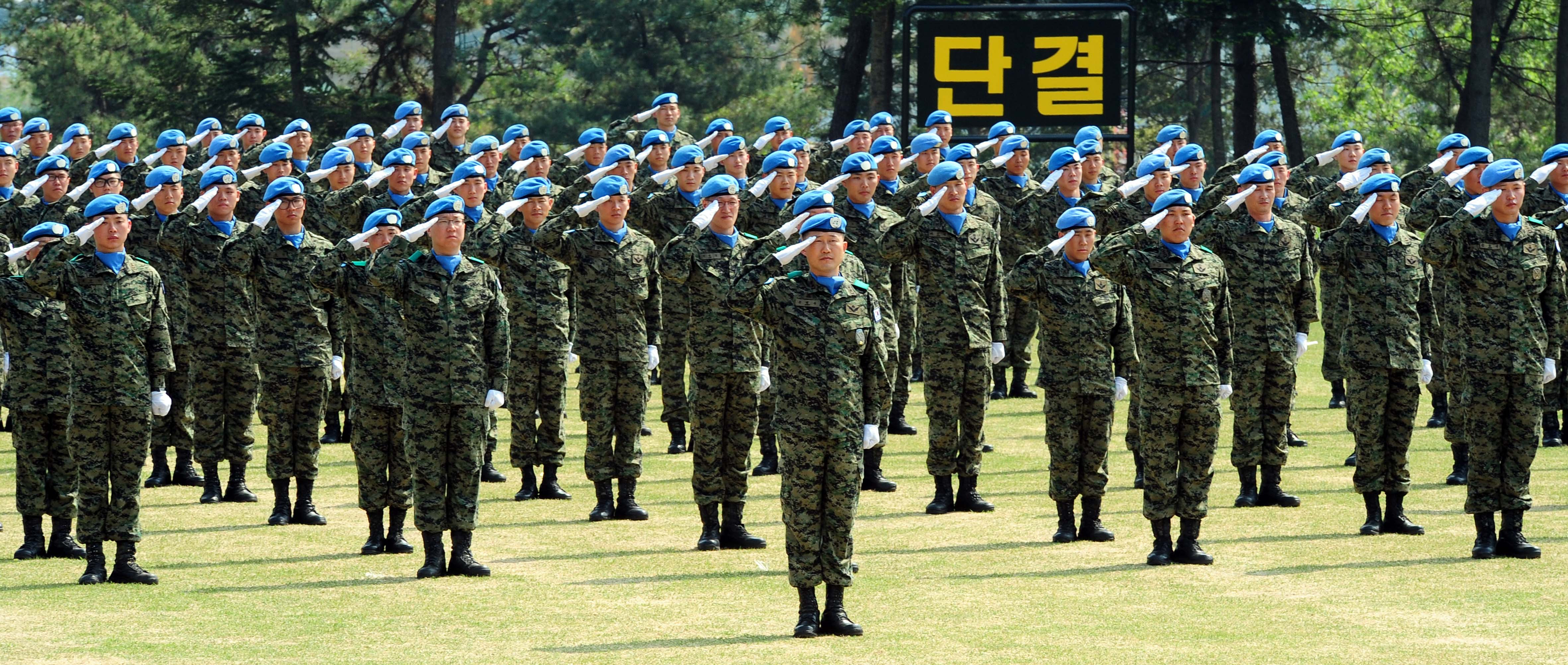
ROK Hanbit Unit in the Republic of South Sudan, Salvation ceremony (2014.04.18)

The Republic of Korea Sudanese Reconstruction Assistance Force or Hanbit Unit (Korean: 한빛부대, Hanbit means 'light which leads the world) are UN peacekeeper forces deployed by the Republic of Korea to the Republic of South Sudan. On July 9, 2011, the Hanbit Unit was dispatched from South Korea to South Sudan, which had separated from Sudan in 2011. Peacekeeping operations began in South Sudan after religious, civil, and racial violence broke out in the new nation, issues which eventually compounded into the South Sudanese Civil War. The Hanbit Unit is the seventh unit dispatched from the Republic of Korea to the United Nations Peacekeeping Forces, preceded by the Sangnoksu Unit (deployed to Somalia, Angolan and East Timor), the Danbi Unit (deployed to Haiti), Dongmyeong Unit (deployed to Lebanon), and a medical support unit sent to the Western Sahara. As of November 2017, the Hanbit Unit remains deployed in South Sudan.

== Deployment background ==
Following Sudan's independence in 1956, the northern and southern regions fought two civil wars, the First Sudanese Civil War (1955–1972) and the Second Sudanese Civil War (1983–2005). In order to prevent further damage, the southern regions was separated from Sudan and the South Sudan became an independent nation in July 2011. The United Nations created the United Nations Mission in South Sudan (UNMISS) to support the South Sudanese peace process in 2011. In 2011, UN Secretary-General Ban Ki-moon asked the government of the Republic of Korea to deploy a unit of the South Korean Army as part of the United Nations' peacekeeping mission in South Sudan. South Korean passed an agreement to form and dispatch a dedicated peacekeeping unit on 27 September 2012, resulting in the Hanbit Unit being created in January 2013.

=== Unit Composition ===
The approximately 290 strong Hanbit unit consisted of engineers and medical personnel accompanied by an armed security detail. The intent of the unit is to aid South Sudan's reconstruction by providing medical support and engineering support.

== Operations in South Sudan ==
=== Hope Road Operation: Bor-Mangela road repair ===
The Bor-Mangela Road is the only established road connecting the South Sudanese city of Bor with the South Sudanese capital of Juba, which is the center of economic activity in the nation. The road, which previously took 2 to 3 days to traverse, was shortened to about 5 hours. In addition, it contributed to the consolidation of residents by improving economic conditions and expanding inter-regional exchanges by lowering prices of industrial products through reduction of transportation costs.

=== White Nile embankment construction ===
The White Nile is a river that flows through the city of Bor, where Hanbit Unit is stationed. The river is major source of water for drinking, irrigation, and industrial use. Every year during the rainy season, Bor has suffered from chronic flooding. To address this issue, the Hanbit Unit built about 17 kilometers of artificial river embankments along the White Nile in 2014. In addition to halting the flooding of Bor, the construction project contributed to the housing environment of Bor by revitalizing housing and road construction in the city. In the future, the Hanbit Unit intends to cooperate with KOICA to install a drainage pump on the bank of the Nile River.

=== Hanbit Vocational School ===
The Hanbit Vocational School is a human resource development program for South Sudan. The school opened in April 2016, and helps students learn trade skills. The school has introduced technologies such as agriculture, woodworking, electricity, welding, architecture, and baking to those who have traditionally been nomadic. Community self-sufficiency was improved due to the elimination of the food shortages, and profits made by South Sudanese businesses were increased. The Hanbit Unit also facilitated cooperation between various South Sudanese tribes by establishing bases to consolidate reconstruction efforts.

=== Medical aid ===
The Hanbit Unit is making efforts to provide the medical services needed for residents with no medical care. The Hanbit Unit's medical staff consists of about 20 military personnel, including four military officers, three nursing officers, and one veteran officer.

=== Taekwondo classroom ===
In 2013, the Hanbit Unit opened an educational program to instruct Sudanese in Taekwondo. As of 2016, about 1,000 people were practicing Taekwondo in Juba and Bor. Some of them participated in the 2016 Rio Olympic qualifying round in Africa.

=== Cultural exchange activities ===
The Hanbit Unit participated in various cultural exchanges, such as UN Day. During these events, the unit spread the "Korean Wave" by teaching activities like Taekwondo and traditional Korean percussion quartet.

== Reactions in South Korea ==
=== Ammunition support from the JSDF ===
Since December 2013, rebels forces fighting the South Sudanese government in the ongoing civil war have approached UN Peacekeeping garrisons. The ROK Army has reserved guns for the war against the rebels through the South Sudan Mission Support Team. On 22 December 2013, the ROK army received about 5,000 rounds of ammunition from the US Army's African Command, and on the following day, ROK Army received 10,000 5.56mm rifle bullets compatible with the K-2 rifle.

This is the first time that the ROK army and the Japanese Self-Defense Forces has supported military supplies since it was created. However, the articles are reported supported only by the Japanese Self-Defense Forces. This is a separate issue from Korea-Japan exchanges, such as the feelings of the Japanese military in Korea or the three principles of arms export in Japan. There is a controversy about this. A South Korean political party criticized that borrowing a bullet from the Self-Defense Forces demonstrates the inability of the ROK army. However, the Korean government explained that the Hanbit unit was a reconstruction unit composed of engineers, so it was equipped with suitable arming and ammunition according to the provisions of the United Nations, and it was supported by the United Nations Command. However, the Japanese government overreacted it and the Prime Minister Abe Shinzo 's visit to the Yasukuni shrine was negatively affected in South Korea, so the Korean Ministry of Defense announced that the ammunition would be returned when it arrives, and all of the ammunition was returned in 2014.

=== Engagement Crisis ===
On December 25, 2013, mortar shells fell near the United Nations base near Bor, where the Hanbit Unit is stationed. A battle between the government forces and the rebels occurred four kilometers south of Hanbit Unit station, and it is suspected that the mortar shells were fired during this engagement. Two 120 mm mortar shells landed 300 meters away from the Hanbit Unit station. Some members of the Nepalese military serving with the UN Peacekeepers in the area suffered minor injuries, but no soldiers from the Hanbit Unit were wounded. In response to the mortar fire, the Hanbit Unit strengthened its defensive capabilities and requested more ammunition and equipment from the ROK Army. Following the incident, the Korean Ministry of Defense announced that it did not consider withdrawing Hanbit Unit, and that it was also considered further dispatches at the request of the United Nations.

According to a January 3, 2014 article, the supply of food and ammunition of the Hanbit Unit was cut off by the rebels and the unit was virtually isolated.

On January 19, 2014, the South Sudanese government recaptured the city of Bor, which became a base of operations for the Hanbit Unit.

=== Encouragement events during President's Africa tour ===
During South Korean President Park Geun-hye's trip to Africa in 2016, she attended an encouragement and welcome dinner with Ethiopian commanders and other delegations in Ethiopia. President Park said, "In the next five years, we will give 6,000 African talents the opportunity to be trained and trained in Korea and Africa, and dispatch 4,000 Korean volunteers to Africa." The ministry also said it will pursue "an exchange plan for 10,000 people for the expansion of human-cultural exchange between Korea and Africa." The Korean government invited 15 Korean soldiers who were sending troops to South Sudan in Africa.
