= Commandos of the Republic of Korea Army =

Republic of Korea Army Commando 대한민국 육군 특공대
- Active: 1 October 1982 –
- Country: South Korea
- Branch: Republic of Korea Army
- Type: Commando
- Role: Unconventional warfare
- Part of: Republic of Korea Army

Commandos of the Republic of Korea Army are elite units of the Republic of Korea Army.

== History ==
On 1 October 1982, '702nd Special Assault Commando Regiment' and '705th Special Assault Commando Regiment' was founded.

Then many commandos were founded and they were attached to each corps in the ROK Army. They were operated under the command of the each Corps Command.

In October 2018, ROK Army changed their name from 'Special Assault Commando' to 'Commando'.

== Active units ==
=== Brigades ===
- 201th Quick Response Brigade - part of 2nd Quick Response Division
  1983-10-10: Founded as the 201th Special Assault Commando Brigade.
  2021-01-01: Attached to 2nd Quick Response Division.
- 203rd Quick Response Brigade - part of 2nd Quick Response Division
  1983-10-10: Founded as the 203rd Special Assault Commando Brigade.
  2021-01-01: Attached to 2nd Quick Response Division.

=== Regiments ===
- 700th Commando Regiment - part of Capital Corps
  1983-07-01: Founded as the 708th Special Assault Commando Regiment.
  1996-12-01: They changed their name to 700th Special Assault Commando Regiment.
- 701st Commando Regiment - part of I Corps
  1983-05-01: Founded as the 701st Special Assault Commando Regiment.
- 702nd Commando Regiment - part of II Corps
  1983-10-01: Founded as the 702nd Special Assault Commando Regiment.
- 703rd Commando Regiment - part of III Corps
  1983-05-01: Founded as the 703rd Special Assault Commando Regiment.
- 705th Commando Regiment - part of V Corps
  1983-10-01: Founded as the 705th Special Assault Commando Regiment.

=== Battalions ===
- 35th Special Mission Battalion - part of Capital Defense Command
  1983-10-01: Founded as the 35th Special Assault Commando.
- 1st Air Assault Battalion - part of VII Maneuver Corps
  1983-10-01: Founded as the 707th Special Assault Commando.
  1983-10-10: Reorganized as the 7th Assault Battalion.
- 2nd Air Assault Battalion - part of VII Maneuver Corps
  1983-10-01: Founded as the 707th Special Assault Commando.
  1983-10-10: Reorganized as the 7th Assault Battalion.

== Difference ==
Most soldiers of ROK Army Commandos were conscripted soldiers but changed to career soldier system just like most soldiers of ROK Army Special Warfare Command are career soldiers.

== See also ==
- Special Forces Brigades of the Republic of Korea Army
