= 3rd Armored Brigade (South Korea) =

Armored brigade of South Korea

- 제3기갑여단
- Active: 1988 – present
- Country: South Korea
- Branch: Republic of Korea Army
- Type: Armored
- Size: Brigade
- Part of: II Corps
- Garrison/HQ: Hongcheon County, Gangwon Province
- Nickname(s): Lightning

Commanders
- Current commander: Brig. Gen. Ju Seong-un

The 3rd Armored Brigade (Korean: 제3기갑여단) is a military formation of the Republic of Korea Army. The brigade is subordinated to the II Corps.

== History ==
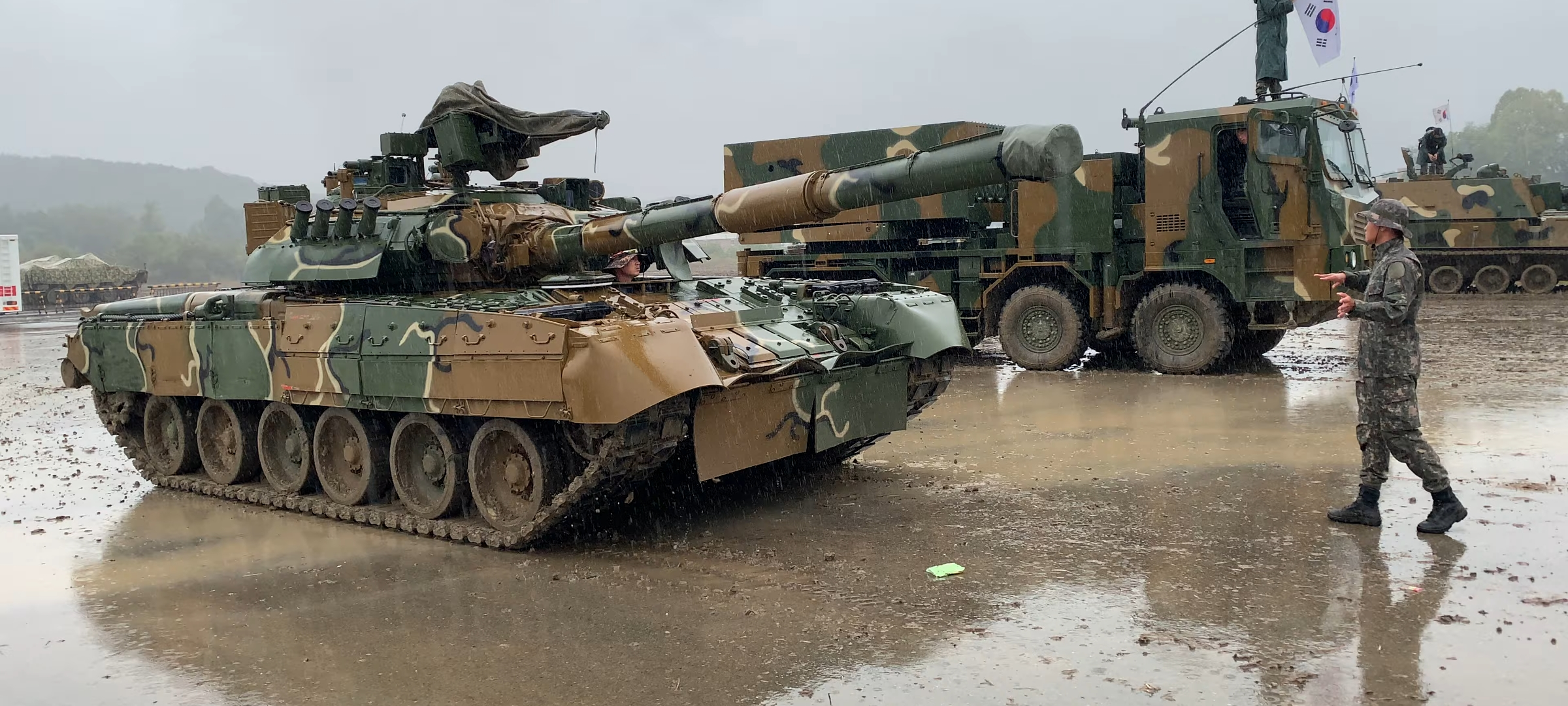
T-80U of the 3rd Armored Brigade

In 1980, it was founded in Deokjeong-dong, Yangju, Gyeonggi Province, as the 3rd independent armored brigade of the ROK Army. In 1983, the 20th Division was reorganized into the 20th Mechanized Infantry Division, so the 107th and 26th Tank Battalion under the 3rd Independent Armored Brigade were subordinated to the 20th Mechanized Infantry Division, and the 27th Tank Battalion was subordinated to the 26th Division. It was disbanded after three years. On 1 September 1988, it was re-established as the 3rd Armored Brigade at Sangmudae, Gwangju, and later moved to its current base in Hongcheon.

The unit operating T-80U and BMP-3, which have been borrowed from Russia. From 1995 to 1997, 33 T-80Us were delivered to South Korea as a part of payment for the debt incurred during the Soviet era. The unit's tank was also used as opposing force during the K2 tank operation test.

== Organization ==
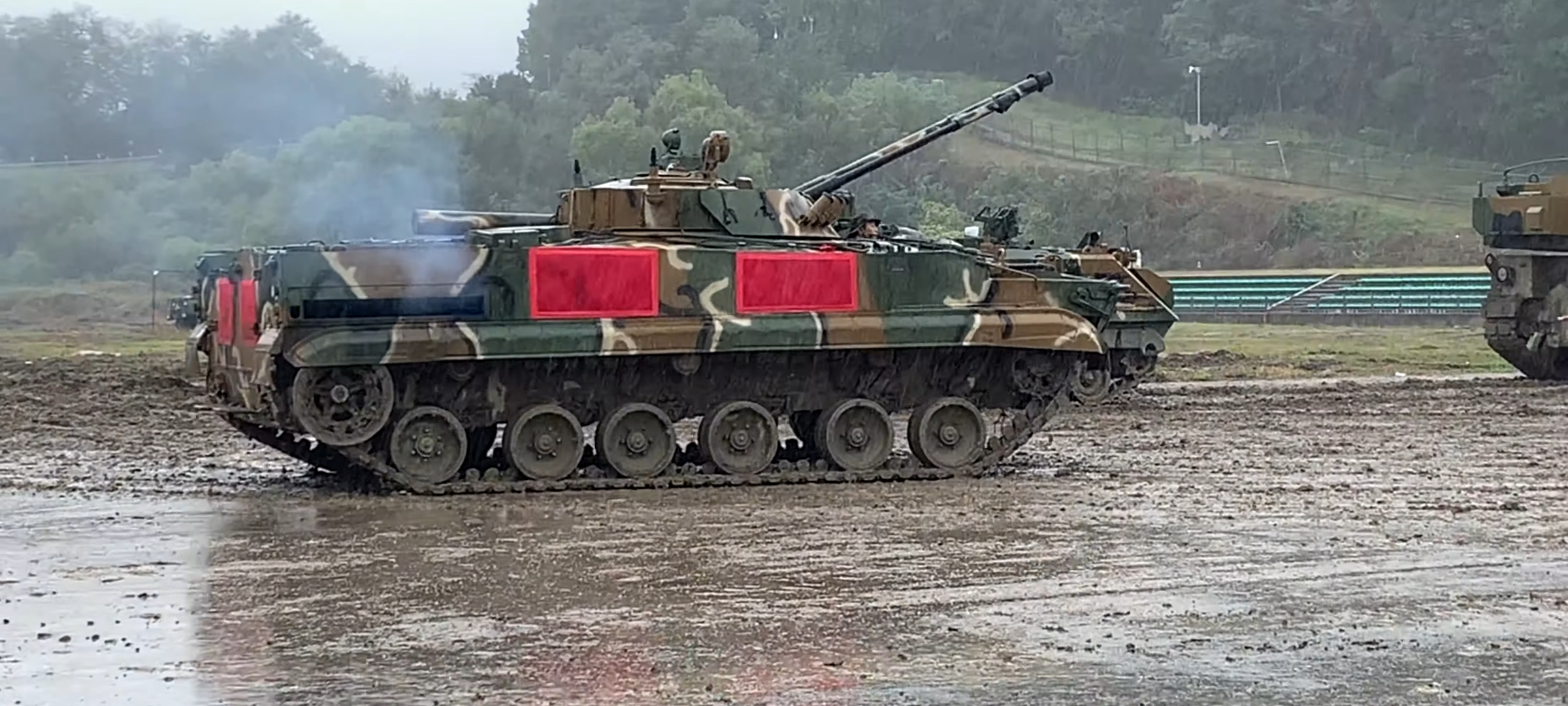
BMP-3 using by 90th Mechanized Infantry Battalion.

- Headquarters:
  - Headquarters Company
  - Air Defense Artillery Battery
  - Armored Engineer Company
  - Chemical Company
  - Armored Reconnaissance Company
  - Signal Company
  - Support Company
  - Intelligence Company
- 80th Armored Battalion (T-80U, being replaced by K1E1)
- 83rd Armored Battalion (K1E1)
- 90th Mechanized Infantry Battalion (BMP-3, being replaced by K200)
- 660th Artillery Battalion (K55)
