= 13th Special Mission Brigade =

13th Special Mission Brigade (Airborne)
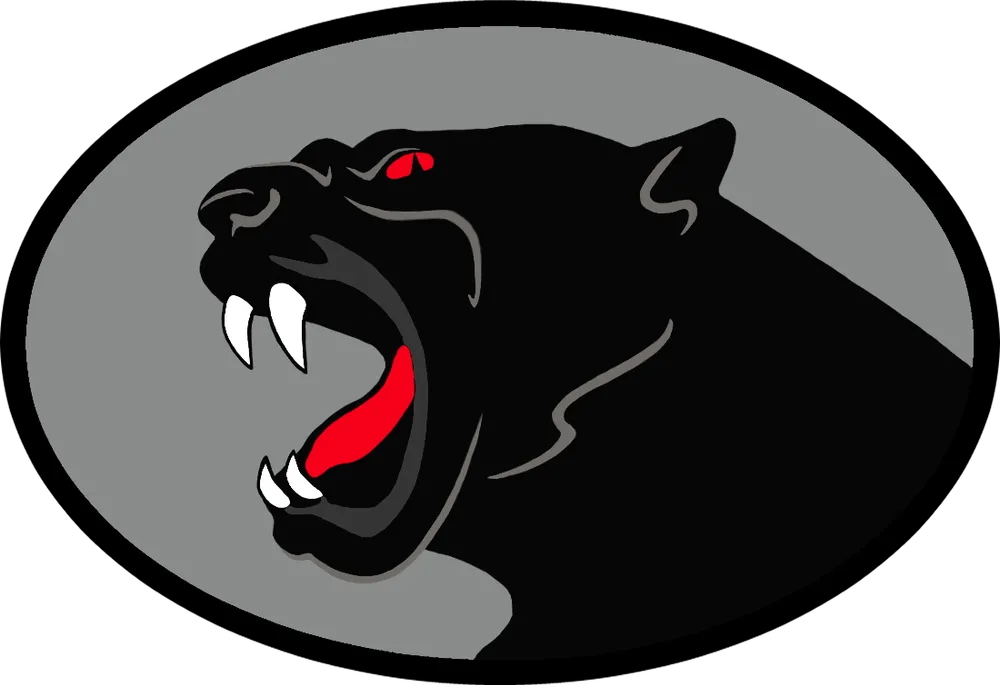
- Active: July 1, 1977 (as the 13th Special Force Brigade); December 1, 2017 (as the 13th Special Mission Brigade)
- Country: South Korea
- Type: Special Forces
- Role: HVT assassination strikes
- Size: Brigade
- Part of: Republic of Korea Army Special Warfare Command
- Garrison/HQ: Jeungpyeong County, North Chungcheong Province
- Nickname: Heukpyo (Black panther)
- Engagements: 2024 South Korean martial law crisis

The 13th Special Mission Brigade (Korean: 제13특수임무여단; Hanja: 第十三特殊任務旅團), also referred to as "Black Panther" (흑표) and "Decapitation Unit" (참수부대), is a special operations force under the Republic of Korea Army Special Warfare Command. It is the only ROK Special Forces Brigade tasked with decapitation attacks.

== History ==
On July 1, 1977, the 13th Special Force Brigade was established in Pocheon, Gyeonggi Province.

On July 20, 1982, the brigade was relocated to Jeungpyeong County, North Chungcheong Province.

The unit was responsible for security during the 1986 Asian Games and the 1988 Olympic Games.

In December 2017, the brigade was restructured and designated as a Special Mission Brigade, earning the nickname "Decapitation Unit (참수부대)."

During the 2024 South Korean martial law crisis, the brigade received orders to prepare for operations at an isolated area.

== Confusion with ROKMC Quick Maneuver Force (Spartan 3000) ==
On September 4, 2017, South Korean Defense Minister Song Young-moo announced the establishment of the "Decapitation Unit (참수부대)" to be completed by December 2017.

However, some Western media misunderstood the announcement and reported that a unit called "Spartan 3000" with the same "Decapitation Unit (참수부대)" task would be formed by the end of 2017. In reality, "Spartan 3000" is a nickname for the ROK Marine Corps Quick Maneuver Force, which had already been formed in March 2016.

The 13th Special Forces Brigade was reorganized as the 13th Special Mission Brigade and assigned with the "Decapitation Unit (참수부대)" task aimed at North Korea's Supreme Leader Kim Jong Un on December 1, 2017.

== Notable former members ==
- Lee Seung-gi

== See also ==
- 707th Special Mission Group
- Republic of Korea Army Special Warfare Command
- Special Forces Brigades of the Republic of Korea
