= 15th Infantry Division (South Korea) =

Republic of Korea Army division

- Active: 8 November 1952 - present
- Country: South Korea
- Branch: Republic of Korea Army
- Type: Infantry
- Size: Division
- Part of: II Corps
- Garrison/HQ: Hwacheon County, Gangwon Province
- Nickname: "Victory"
- Engagements: Korean War

Commanders
- Current commander: Maj. Gen. Kang Hyeon-u

The 15th Infantry Division (Korean: 제15보병사단) is a military formation of the ROKA. The 15th division is subordinated to the II Corps and is headquartered in Hwacheon County, Gangwon Province. It is a frontline division that protects the GOP and GP of Hwacheon County and Cheorwon County.

The division was created on 8 November 1952, during the Korean War.

== Organization ==
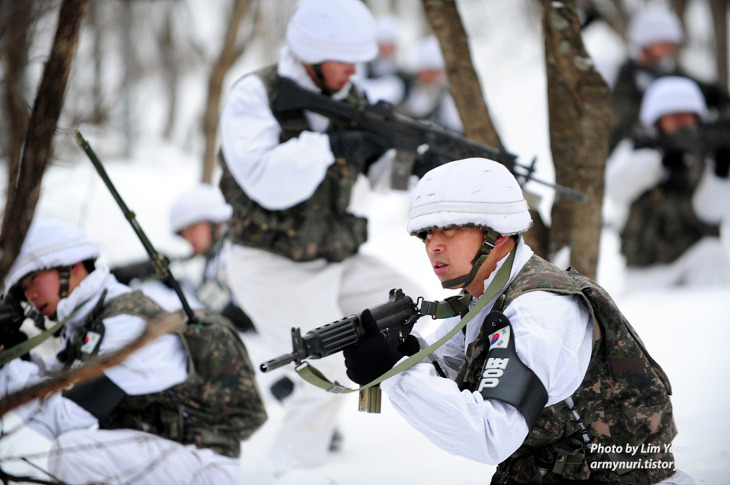
Soldiers of the 15th Infantry Division during search operation at the DMZ.

- Headquarters:
  - Headquarters Company
  - Intelligence Company
  - Air Defense Company
  - Reconnaissance Battalion
  - Engineer Battalion
  - Armored Battalion
  - Signal Battalion
  - Support Battalion
  - Military Police Battalion
  - Medical Battalion
  - Chemical Battalion
- 38th Infantry Brigade "lightening"(equipped with K200 APCs)
- 39th Infantry Brigade "Ulchi"(equipped with K200 APCs)
- 50th Infantry Brigade "Eagle" (equipped with K200 APCs)
- Artillery Brigade (equipped with K9 SPHs)
