= Armed Forces Nursing Academy =

Coordinates: 36°24′05″N 127°20′59″E

- Type: National
- Established: January 6, 1951
- Location: Daejeon, South Korea
- Website: www.kafna.ac.kr
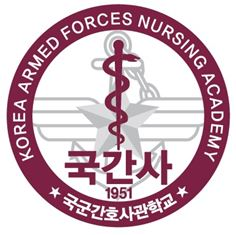

Korean name
- Hangul: 국군간호사관학교
- Hanja: 國軍看護士官學校
- RR: Gukgun ganho sagwan hakgyo
- MR: Kukkun kanho sagwan hakkyo

Armed Forces Nursing Academy (Korean: 국군간호사관학교) is a college located in Yuseong-gu, Daejeon, South Korea.

== Background ==
The Armed Forces Nursing Academy of Korea is a four-year university. It was established for the purpose of providing individuals aspiring to become nurse officers of the Armed Forces with necessary education. To complete the nursing degree one must complete two sets of courses. The first are military courses prescribed by the Minister of National Defense. The other courses are general courses prescribed by the Minister of National Defense in collaboration with the Minister of Education.

== Staff ==
The superintendent is appointed by the Minister of National Defense from among general officers.

== Professors ==
“Professors and associate professors shall be appointed by the President with a recommendation by the Minister of National Defense, assistant professors shall be appointed by the Minister of National Defense with a recommendation by the Superintendent, and teaching assistants shall be appointed by the Superintendent.”

== Students ==
All attendees of the academy will be registered into the military upon admission. One may not be younger than 17 years old or older than 21 years older and must be unmarried. One must also meet the physical standards of the Nursing Academy and have the educational background required. Those who successfully graduate and pass the national nursing examination will be commissioned as a second lieutenant in the Korean Military. Graduates will also obtain their Bachelors in Nursing. Those who fail will be removed from the military registry.

== History of nursing education in Korea ==
During the time of the Japanese occupation, Korea's health care facilities and nursing education had been disorganized. The education and nursing system lacked a lot of resources and information that was needed for the profession. They also lacked the means to be able to educate others in the field properly. In 1946, the U.S military had unified the nursing education. They standardized the curriculum for Korea and helped provide instruction for the faculty in the nursing education facilities. During the Korean War both Korean and American nurses played a large role. However, after the war Korea had to focus on reestablishing and furthering the Korean nursing education. As a part of nursing education, emphasis had been placed on midwifery as well.
