= Sangnoksu Unit =

United Nations Peacekeeping Force

The Sangnoksu Unit (Korean: 상록수부대, Hanja: 常綠樹 sangnoksu means 'always be blue(pure)') is one of the UN Peacekeeping Forces sent to Somalia, Angola, and East Timor by Republic of Korea Armed Forces (ROKA). Sangnoksu unit is the first unit for the purpose of maintaining peace in South Korea. After joining the UN in 1991, Sangnoksu unit started its peacekeeping missions in Somalia from July 1993 to March 1994. From October 1995 to December 1996, Sangnoksu unit performed its missions in Angola. Lastly, it was sent for peacekeeping operations in East Timor from October 1999 to October 2003. After 2003, Sangnoksu unit was disbanded.

== Sangnoksu Unit in Somalia (1993. 7 ~ 1994. 3. 15) ==
=== Symbol ===
The name of the Sangnoksu unit contains pure meaning. The name of the Sangnoksu unit, which has the historical records of the first UN peacekeeping operations (PKO) of South Korea in 1993, signifies that the desolate land will be replaced by the blue land. The background is red and the symbol of Korea army is depicted in white. The name of unit is inscribed.

=== Dispatch background ===
Somalia, located in the Horn of Africa, has a population of about 15.6 million people, but there are 1.5 million refugees because of long-term civil war. Somalian are major(85 percent of the population), but there is a multiracial group such as Helman, Arabs, and Indian. Somalia was originally an Islamic Emirate since the end of the 19th century, but it became independent from Britain and Italy on July 1, 1960. Although the coup regime assumed power in 1969, a large and small civil war continued to ensue. In January 1991, the United Somali Congress (USC), a group of Somali rebels, expelled the Barre regime of the Somali Revolutionary Socialist Party (SRSP), which has continued to reign after the coup d'état, which has continued its dictatorship and nepotism. But in the United Somali Congress (USC), conflicts between president Mahdi and chairman of Aidid have been getting worse and consequently the civil war of anarchy has been lasted. The United Nations established the United Nations Operation in Somalia I (UNOSOM I) in April 1992 for peace and reconstruction of Somalia under the United Nations Security Council Resolution 733. However, the civil war continued as the infighting continued, and the state of anarchy continued. In December 1992, the U.S.-led multinational force was dispatched to Somalia, and the United Nations Operation in Somalia II (UNOSOM II) was established in March 1993. In February 1993, South Korea decided to dispatch troops after a field survey and three related ministries’ meeting in order to actively participate in the UN peacekeeping effort and enhance international status. On May 18, 1993, South Korea dispatched 516 members to carry out UN peacekeeping operations, which were held in Mogadishu from July 1993 to March 15, 1994.

=== Activities ===
Sangnoksu unit served as a peacekeeping force to protect and repair various facilities, such as protection facilities, water and sewage, electrical facilities, roads, and bridges. In addition, it helped to restart the textile farms by allowing residents to cultivate about 5,000 hectares of farmland and reoperate cotton plants. The establishment of technology schools, which could instill national consciousness and independence, led to a high degree of responsiveness from local residents. Activity of Sangnoksu unit in Somalia was the first of activities as the UN peacekeeping operations to overcome various difficult conditions and exceeded expectations. Through this, Republic of Korea Armed Forces have become confident that it can successfully fulfill any mission in any part of the world.

== Sangnoksu Unit in Angola (1995.10. 5 ~ 1996.12. 23) ==
=== Symbol ===
The background of the flag is red meaning military engineer and the castle and sword means a badge of military engineer. On the upper left side of the flag is the UN symbol, the other side is South Korea.

=== Dispatch background ===
Angola is a country in Southern Africa. It is the seventh-largest country in Africa. Since it gained independence from Portugal in 1975, the Civil War had begun between the People's Movement for the Liberation of Angola (MPLA)(Portuguese: Movimento Popular de Libertação de Angola) and the National Union for the Total Independence of Angola (UNITA). Although a peace treaty was concluded in May 1991, the National Union for the Total Independence of Angola (UNITA), which lost the referendum under the arbitration of the UN, caused the civil war again. In the process, the United Nations established United Nations Angola Verification Mission (UNAVEM) and the United Nations Observer Mission in Angola (MONUA). In February 1995, the United Nations asked South Korea to participate in United Nations Angola Verification Mission (UNAVEM). 201 people were dispatched on October 5, 1995, and 600 people were dispatched additionally by December 23, 1996.

=== Activities ===
The army, which was dispatched to Ruwanda Ovambo in Angola, actively implemented humanitarian relief efforts, as well as successfully carried out missions, repairs assigned by the United Nations. They recovered 8 bridges in the Chipipa, 2 airfields in the Ovambo and five sites including accommodation facilities and provided technical support. As the humanitarian relief activities, they actively provided support for diverse fields such as the establishment of a fountain, orphanages and cathedrals, schools.

== Sangnoksu Unit in East Timor (1999.10. 28 ~ 2003.10. 23) ==
=== Dispatch background ===
East Timor, located in the eastern tip of the Indonesian island of Timor, is an area living in approximately 85 million people. East Timor had been under the control of Portugal for over 450 years since the 16th century and has been forced into Indonesia's 27th state in 1975. For the next 20 years, it continued to fight for independence from Indonesia, and eventually settled down independence by the referendum. On August 30, 1999, the referendum was held under the UN, and 98.6 percent of voters voted. While 78.5 percent of voters voted for their independence, the rebel militia turned out a bloody violence. There were many refugees in the process, and tens of thousands of people were killed. Even, the United Nations Mission in East Timor (UNAMET) for helping the referendum fled to Australia. The Indonesian government declared a state of emergency of East Timor and sought to resolve the confusion, but eventually accepted the dispatch of multinational forces to secure the situation. On September 15, 1999, the United Nations Security Council (UNSC) adopted a resolution to approve the establishment of coalition forces, which undertook a mission to secure public peace in East Timor. On October 25, the United Nations Security Council (UNSC) approved the establishment of the United Nations Mission in East Timor (UNAMET) through the Security Council Resolution 1272, and in February 2000, more than 8,300 U.N. peacekeepers were replaced by coalition forces. On September 15, 1999, South Korea decided to dispatch troops for the first time to contribute to UN peacekeeping operations, which the United Nations has imposed on coalition forces, and finally dispatched 430 people on October 28. They successfully conducted a mission granted to stabilize security and peace of East Timor by October 23, 2003.

=== Activities ===
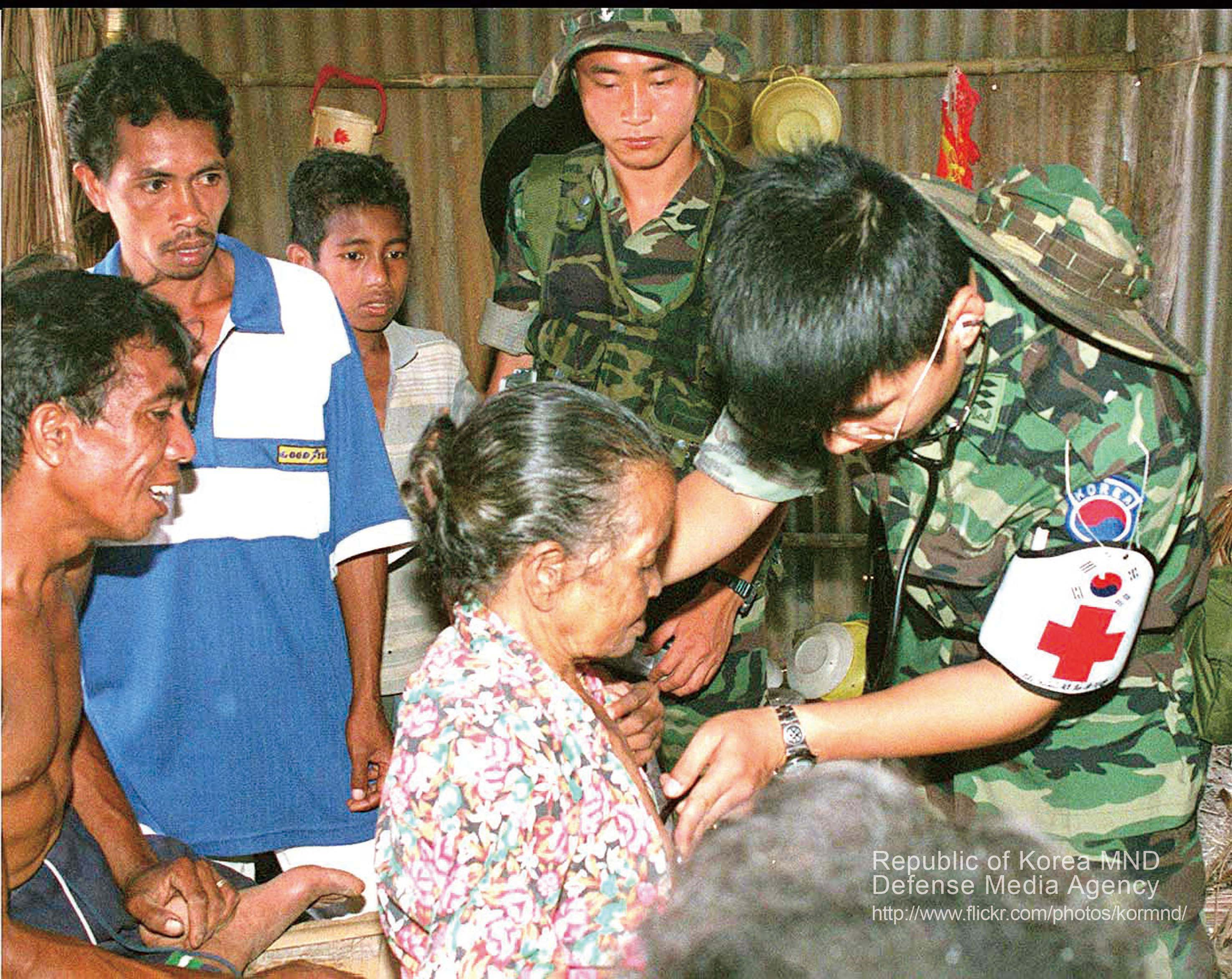
Medical services were provided by an army surgeon of the Sangnoksu Unit to the local populace.

The Sangnoksu unit was assigned to maintain security, peace, civil operations, and rehabilitation assistance. Troops stationed in Lospalos carried out patrols in nearby areas, including roads and densely populated dwellings three times a day. They provided 24-hour vigilance within the area. They also provided security guards and escort services during a visit of the helicopter of coalition forces and key personnel. In order to maintain peace, the squad conducted a patrol activity and policed potential threats such as illegal weapon holders. Also they tried to form trust with local residents by listening to opinions through daily interviews with the village chief and principals. In addition, they had performed multiple activities in various diverse environments such as sudden changes in weather patterns, conflicts between militias and an army for national independence, and the flow of refugees. Thus, the UN evaluated the Sangnoksu unit as the most exemplary troops of the UN peacekeeping operations.
