= 1st Special Forces Brigade =

Unit of the Republic of Korea Army Special Warfare Command

1st Special Forces Brigade (Airborne)
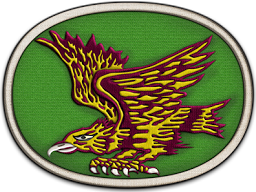
- Active: 1 April 1958 – present
- Country: South Korea
- Type: Airborne Special Forces
- Size: Brigade
- Part of: Republic of Korea Army Special Warfare Command
- Garrison/HQ: Gimpo International Airport; Gangseo District, Seoul
- Nickname: Docksuri (Eagle)
- Engagements: May 16 coup Korean Special Forces Break-in Scandal; Vietnam War; Operation Paul Bunyan; Coup d'état of December Twelfth; 2024 South Korean martial law crisis

Commanders
- Notable commanders: Chun Doo Hwan; Park Hee Do

The 1st Special Forces Brigade (Airborne) (Korean: 제1공수특전여단; Hanja: 第一空輸特戰旅團; RR: Je 1 Gongsuteugjeon-yeodan), also known as Eagle (독수리), is an Airborne Special Forces unit of the Republic of Korea Army Special Warfare Command.

== History ==
On 1 April 1958, 1st Combat Group was founded and most members were from the 8240th Army Unit.

On 1 October 1958, reorganized as the 1st Special Forces Group.

On 15 September 1972, reorganized into as the 1st Special Forces Brigade.

=== Vietnam War ===
1,172 of 1st Special Forces Group participated in the Vietnam War.

They were attached to Capital Mechanized Infantry Division and 9th Infantry Division.

They conducted the special operations including long-range reconnaissance patrol, surprise attacks by hit-and-run tactics and so on.

=== Operation Paul Bunyan ===
64 of 1st Special Forces Brigade participated in the Operation Paul Bunyan in 1976.

== Criticism ==
The 1st Special Forces Brigade has been the most habitually/consistently used/involved unit in every single major military action against the ROK civilian government (May 16 coup (1961), Coup d'état of December Twelfth (1979), and 2024 South Korean martial law).

On 21 May 1964, some of its members broke into a courtroom and the house of a judge to demand an arrest warrant.

== Notable former members ==
- Moon Jae-in
- Chun Doo-Hwan
- Park Hee-Do

== See also ==
- Republic of Korea Army Special Warfare Command
- Special Forces Brigades of the Republic of Korea
