= II Corps (South Korea) =

- Active: 24 July 1950 – present
- Country: Republic of Korea
- Branch: Republic of Korea Army
- Role: Offensive force
- Size: Corps
- Part of: Ground Operations Command
- Nickname: Double Dragons
- Colors: Red
- Engagements: Korean War

Commanders
- Current commander: Lieutenant General Ko Hyun-soo
- Notable commanders: Yu Jae-hung; Paik Sun Yup; Kim Kwan-jin

The II Corps (nicknamed "Double Dragons") is a corps of the Republic of Korea Army and it was first activated during the Korean War.

== History ==
The II Corps was created on July 24, 1950, just before the Battle of Pusan Perimeter, consisting of the 1st Infantry Division and the 6th Infantry Division. During the Battle of the Pusan Perimeter (July–September, 1950), its headquarters was at Hamch’ang.

Currently, its headquarters is located in Chuncheon.

=== Korean War ===
==== Liberation of South Korea ====
Lieutenant General Walton Walker of the US Army ordered that ROK Army units, scattered by the North Korean invasion, be organized into two corps. Thus the II Corps was born July 24, 1950, to defend the Pusan Perimeter.

==== Invading North Korea ====
On October 10, 1950, the II Corps advanced north of the 38th parallel through central North Korea. They were operating in support of the ROK I Corps which was under the command of General Walker. After encountering minimal resistance, the corps veered northwest.

==== Defeat at Ch'ongch'on ====
On October 24, hoping to end the conflict quickly, General Douglas MacArthur, Commander of UN forces, ordered an offensive to the northern border of North Korea and form a defensive line at the Yalu River. At the Battle of the Ch'ongch'on River in October 1950, the Chinese People's Volunteer Army sent the 13th Army in to catch the II Corps off guard. In doing so, battles were fought in various places such as Onjong and Unsan. By November 4, 1950, the II Corps and the 8th Regiment of the US 1st Cavalry Division were destroyed.

== Structure ==
- Direct
  - Headquarters Unit
  - 702nd Commando Regiment
  - 142nd Intelligence Battalion
  - 102nd Signal Group
  - 302nd Security Group
  - 1st Armor Battalion
  - 12th CBRN Battalion
  - 512nd Air Defense Battalion
- Attached
  - 7th Infantry Division
  - 15th Infantry Division
  - 2nd Engineer Brigade
  - 2nd Artillery Brigade
  - 2nd Logistic Support Brigade
