= Republic of Korea Army Special Warfare Command =

ROK Army command

- 대한민국 육군 특수전사령부
- Active: 1 April 1958 – present
- Country: South Korea
- Type: Special Operations Command
- Role: Special operations; Direct action; Special reconnaissance; Counter-terrorism
- Size: ~5,000
- Part of: Republic of Korea Army
- Garrison/HQ: Icheon, Gyeonggi Province
- Nicknames: "Black Berets", "ROKSF"
- Mottos: 안 되면 되게 하라 ("Make Impossible Possible"); 귀신 같이 접근하여, 번개 같이 타격하고, 연기 같이 사라져라 ("Approach like a Ghost, Strike like Thunder, Vanish like Smoke")
- Engagements: Vietnam War; Operation Paul Bunyan; Gwangju Uprising; 1999 East Timorese crisis; Operation Enduring Freedom; Iraq War

Commanders
- Current commander: Unknown

The Republic of Korea Army Special Warfare Command (ROKA SWC; Korean: 대한민국 육군 특수전사령부; 특전사; Hanja: 大韓民國陸軍 特殊戰司令部), also known as the Republic of Korea Army Special Forces "Black Berets" (ROK Special Forces), is a strategic-level military command of the Republic of Korea Army responsible for their special operations forces. ROK Special Forces brigades work in a close relationship with their United States Army Special Forces counterparts and other allies in international security and intervention missions.

Since 1993, the Republic of Korea Army has trained experts by sending officers to various PKO training institutions such as the Northern Europe United Nations Training Corps (UNTC), Poland, and Ireland, and since 1995 officers and related government officials have been sent to the Pearson Peacekeeping Center (PPC) in Canada. To lay the foundation for PKO education domestically, in 1995 the military designated the Joint Services Staff College to be the lead institution to educate officers to become military observers and staff. In May 1998, the PKO Department was officially inaugurated within the college. Moreover, the Special Warfare Command's Education Corps was designated as the institution solely responsible for unit-level education of PKO forces by providing solid education for infantry and engineer personnel.

== Organization ==
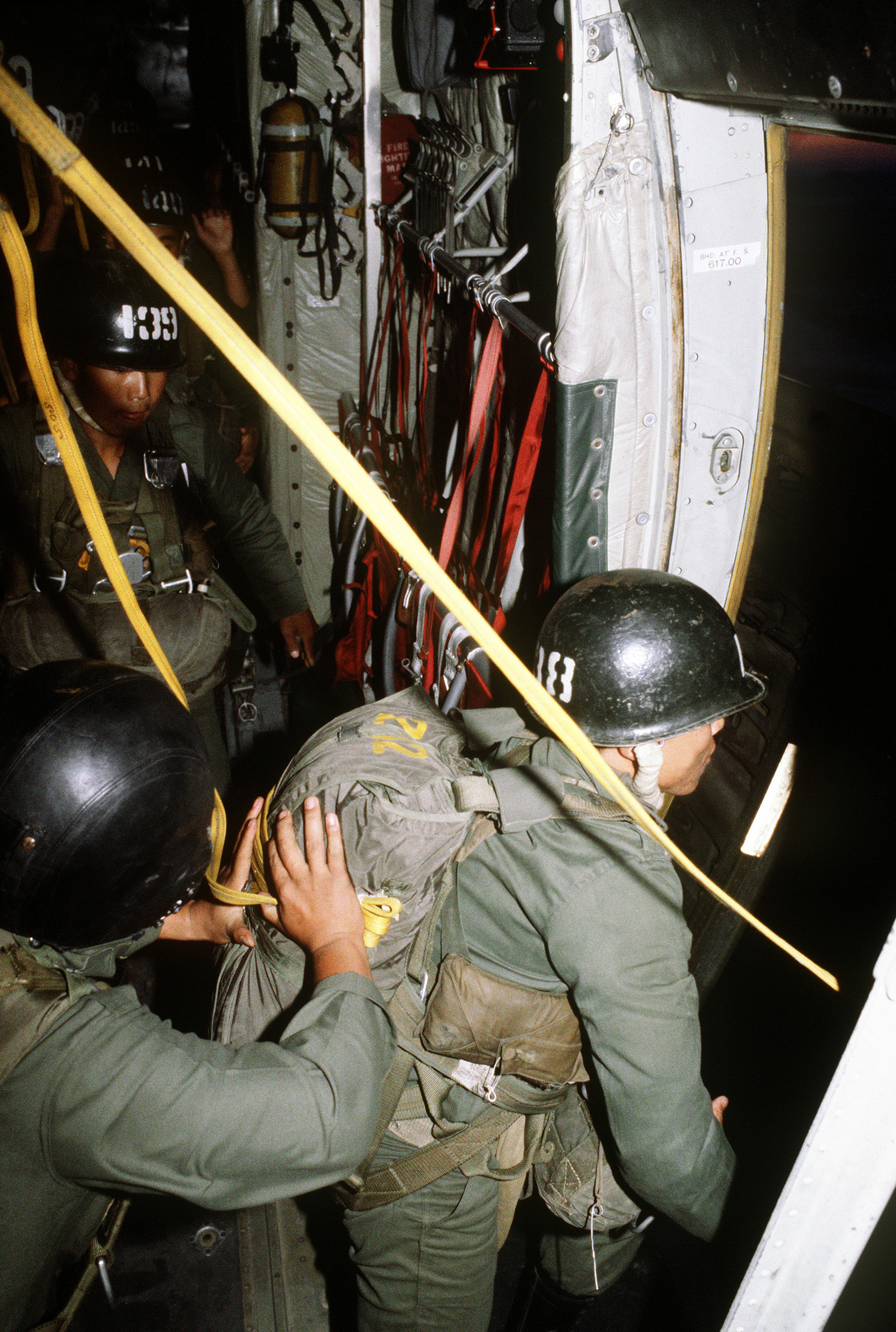
South Korean paratroopers prepare to jump from a C-130 in 1980.

The command includes six special forces brigades and one overseas deployment group. They receive special training for various unconventional warfare missions. These seven units began to be established from 1958 and fall under the jurisdiction of the Special Warfare Command, which was established in 1969. ROK special forces brigades' primary tasks include guerrilla warfare, special reconnaissance, unconventional warfare, direct action, collecting information in enemy territory and carrying out special missions. Members of these brigades undergo specialized training in weapons handling and parachuting. Each brigade has about 600 men distributed in four battalions, with each battalion having three companies and each company having five teams of ten men.

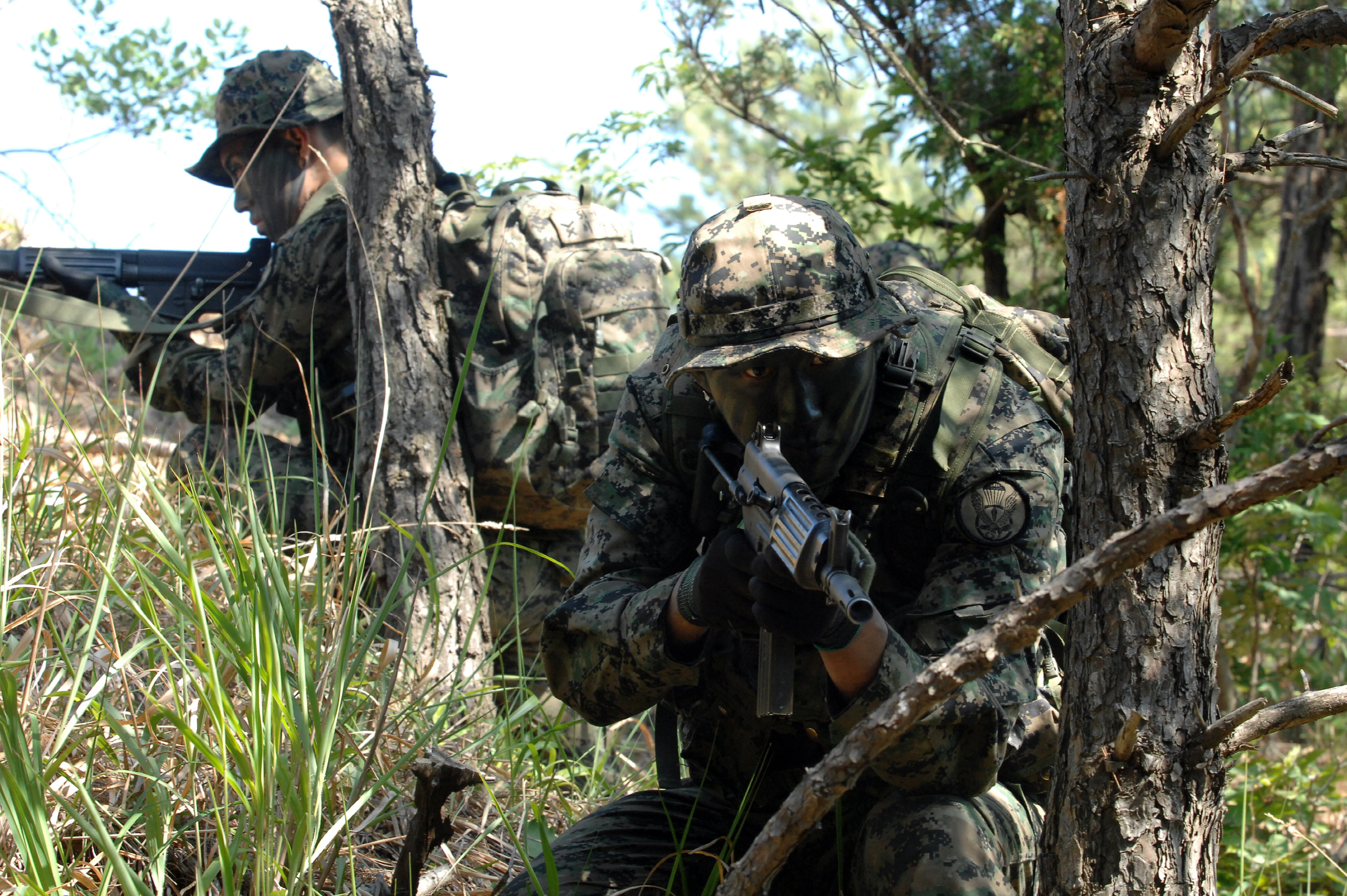
ROKASWC soldiers during infiltration training

Units of the command include:

- 1st Special Forces Brigade (Airborne) 'Eagle' – founded on April 1, 1958
  - 1st Battalion
  - 2nd Battalion
  - 3rd Battalion
  - 5th Battalion
- 3rd Special Forces Brigade (Airborne) 'Flying Tiger' – founded on January 1, 1969
  - 11th Battalion
  - 12th Battalion
  - 13th Battalion
  - 15th Battalion
- International Peace Supporting Standby Force 'Whole World' – founded on February 19, 1969 as 5th Special Forces Brigade (Airborne), reorganized on June 1, 2000
  - 21st Battalion
  - 22nd Battalion
  - 23rd Battalion
  - 25th Battalion
- 7th Special Forces Brigade (Airborne) 'Pegasus' – founded on October 1, 1974
  - 31st Battalion
  - 32nd Battalion
  - 33rd Battalion
  - 35th Battalion
- 9th Special Forces Brigade (Airborne) 'Ghost' – founded on October 1, 1974
  - 51st Battalion
  - 52nd Battalion
  - 53rd Battalion
  - 55th Battalion
- 11th Special Forces Brigade (Airborne) 'Golden Bat' – founded on July 1, 1977
  - 61st Battalion
  - 62nd Battalion
  - 63rd Battalion
  - 65th Battalion
- 13th Special Mission Brigade 'Black Panther' – founded on July 1, 1977, reorganized as the "decapitation unit" as of 2017
  - 71st Battalion
  - 72nd Battalion
  - 73rd Battalion
  - 75th Battalion
- 707th Special Mission Group 'White Tiger' – founded on 17 April 1981
- Special Warfare School
- Special Operations Aviation Group

=== Assassination Brigade ===
Due to rapidly increasing threats from the North, South Korea announced the reorganization of a special forces brigade by the end of 2017, with the sole purpose of assassinating high-ranking members of the DPRK's leadership in the event of a war. Tasked with the "Decapitation Missions" the new brigade, organized along the lines of the 75th Ranger Regiment, consisting of roughly 1,000 men would be formed by the end of 2017 and would be deployed directly to Pyongyang in an event of a war on the Korean peninsula. This was seen as part of South Korea's continued development of their own preemptive strike protocol.

The 13th Brigade was selected to be reorganized and rearmed for the role originally scheduled for 2019, but advancement of the nuclear and missile capabilities of the North has progressed faster than expected. On December 1, 2017, the unit was created as planned. The new 13th Special Missions Brigade and held its founding ceremony. The new unit will be equipped with special weapons capable of underwater and ground combat operations, a special rifle for grenade launchers and other means of transport suitable for air, sea and underwater infiltration such as special operations transport aircraft. It was reported that the elite U.S. naval special missions unit DEVGRU, also known as SEAL Team Six, as well as the British Army's Elite Special Air Service will provide training and have an advisory role to help the brigade prepare for its assassination missions.

== Selection and training ==
The operators within the Republic of Korea Special Warfare Command serve longer than the usual military conscripts within the ROKA. The service term lasts 4 years and 3 months in comparison with the usual 1 year and 6 months for a typical conscript in the regular army because operators are career soldiers. This includes the 3 months of training that all recruits must undergo before becoming attached to a specific brigade. Those who wish to remain in service for longer than the set term may do so.

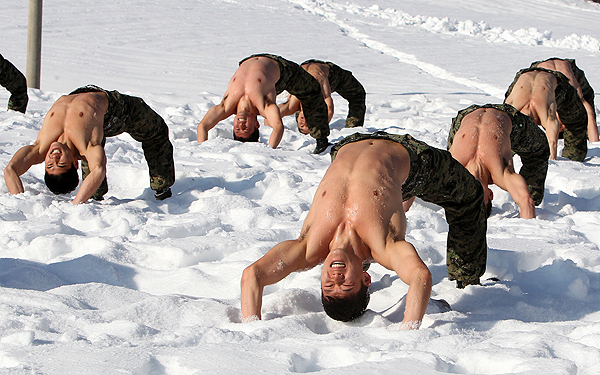
SWC operators training in the snow

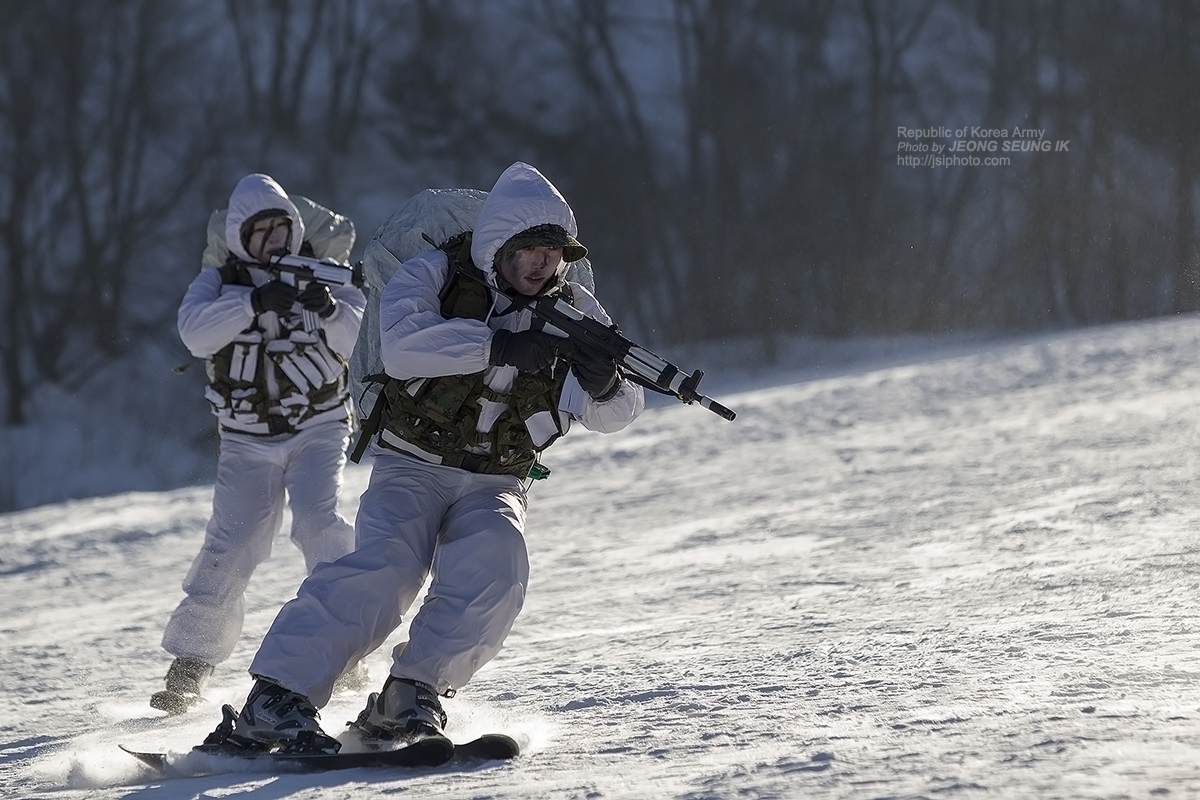
SWC operators using skis to train in the snow

During the first month of training, recruits will have to undergo a strenuous physical test to ensure they are physically capable of fulfilling their role. This will include 25 km runs across mountainous terrain with a 30 kg load out under timed conditions as well as daily fitness regimes to weed out physically incapable recruits. Firearms training and weapons handling training will naturally be integrated throughout the 3-month training period. Due to the nature of the Korean warfare tactics, operators will be taught two main methods of infiltration into North Korea: aerial infiltration and naval infiltration which includes, for example, High Altitude Low Opening (HALO) training and SCUBA training. The aim of this part of the training is to make the operators as versatile as possible to ensure that they can tackle the difficult Korean terrain. On the ground they will undergo mountaineering training as well as survival training which involves them surviving without communications and limited supplies for up to a week. Resistance to interrogation training is also employed by the organization. This has led to several deaths such as one recruit dying from suffocation while being put in a typical stress position for several hours during captivity training. Moreover, sub-zero training is enforced during the winter which involves recruits being fully submerged in ice-cold water and carrying out physical training drills in the snow without their tops.

Hand-to-hand combat, consisting of Teukgong Moosool and Krav Maga, is strongly emphasized within the ROKASWC but is taught after the 3-month training period once the operators have been attached to a particular brigade.

== Evergreen unit ==
The Evergreen Unit (Korean: 상록수부대) is an ad hoc, all-volunteer, amalgamated ROK Army unit (usually of battalion strength), composed of various members of the South Korean military (including infantry, combat support elements such as engineers and medics, ROK Special Forces and the ROK Marine Corps.), trained specifically for conducting worldwide security operations and rendering humanitarian assistance during ad hoc overseas deployments and UN Peacekeeping Operations.

=== Somalia ===
The South Korean military participated in UN-led Peacekeeping Operations for the first time ever when it activated and deployed the "Evergreen" unit in the summer of 1993 to Somalia for the purpose of overseas reconstruction and humanitarian work. The Evergreen unit is an amalgamated ROK Army battalion-sized engineering unit (named after Korea's ubiquitous perennial conifers), activated for the first time on June 30, 1993 specifically for the Somali PKO deployment (United Nations Operation in Somalia II). The battalion-sized element, consisting of 504 men (rotated annually), repaired roads and rendered humanitarian assistance. By the time their mission ended in September 1994, the Evergreen unit deployed some 2,700 men and 1,300 pieces of equipment, successfully linking Balad and Zohar via a rebuilt road, and effectively cooperating with U.S. forces in building another road from Balad to Afgoa.

=== East Timor ===
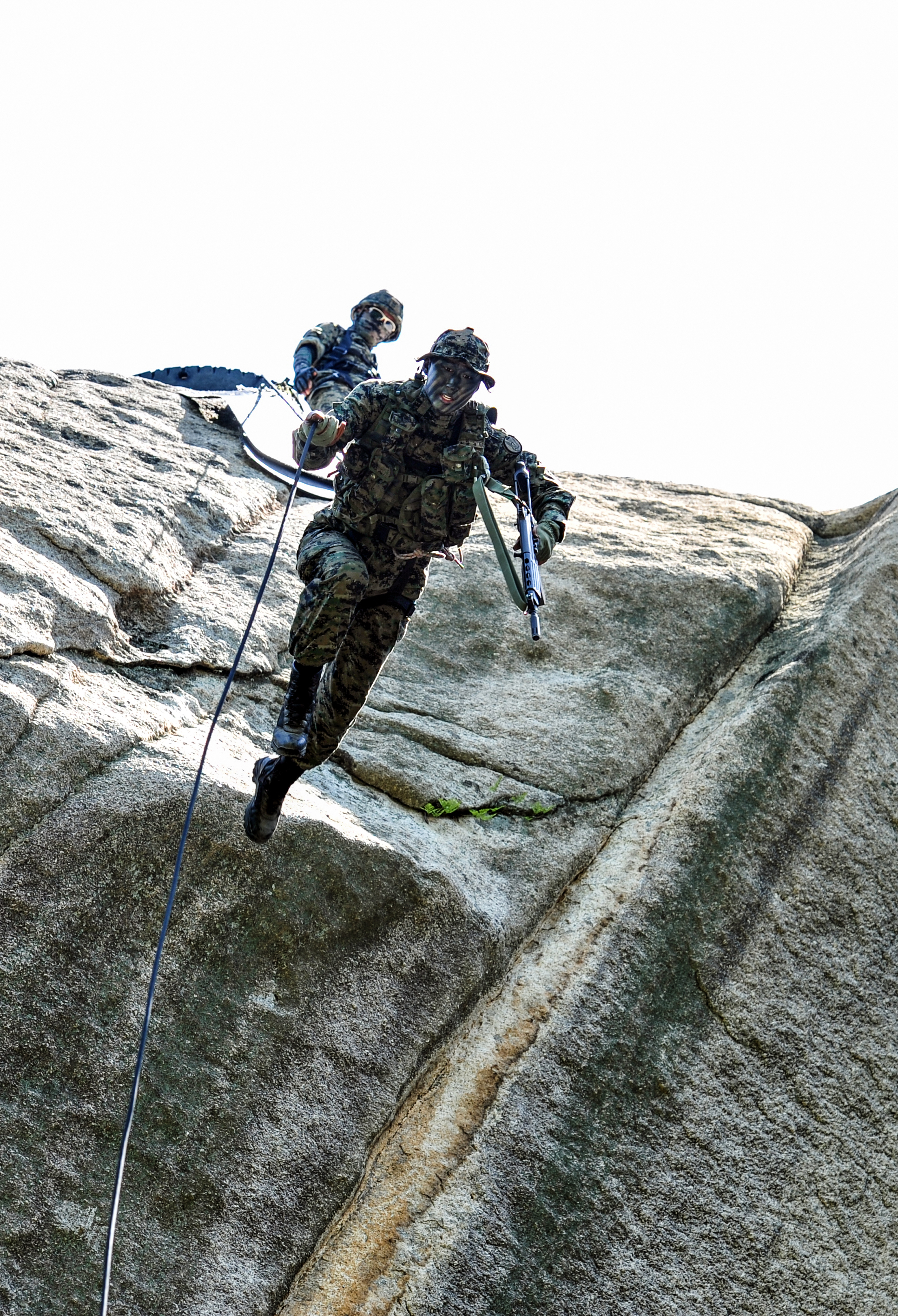
SWC operator during mountaineering drills

On August 30, 1999, a UN-mandated referendum for independence in East Timor was held, in which 78.5 percent of the electorate opted for independence. However, Indonesia fomented militias who opposed East Timor's independence, causing devastating violence. Accordingly, the UN Security Council adopted a resolution to grant installation of the International Forces in East Timor (INTERFET), and the UN Secretary General together with the government of Australia officially requested the South Korean government's participation.

Indonesia agreed to the deployment of the multinational forces and actively requested the participation of Asian nations.

In response to the international request to maintain security and restore order, the South Korean government authorized the formation of a second Evergreen Unit. With a battalion strength of 419 men—201 from ROK Special Forces with the balance of personnel from transportation, supply, communications, and medical specialties—the Evergreen unit arrived in Lautem, East Timor on 1 October 1999. Upon their arrival, the area was still reeling from post-election violence and 40 per cent of the island's built-up infrastructure—including markets, schools and housing—had been destroyed by rioters. The population of 50,000 had dropped to 20,000 as a result of refugee movement in response to the widespread violence. Shortly thereafter, the 2nd Evergreen Unit formally initiated operations on 22 October 1999 in Lospalos, East Timor. Using its security component, detached from the 5th Special Forces brigade, Special Warfare Command, the Evergreen's area of responsibility covered just 12% of East Timor's land mass.

After a six-month deployment that ended on 28 April 2000, the original 419 men of the Korean battalion returned to Korea after conducting a two-week-long, in-theater handover and orientation for their replacements. In February 2002, the battalion was redeployed to the Oecusse-Ambeno enclave to continue peacekeeping operations. In April, 2003, an additional 250-strong element from the 8th ROK BATT, deployed for a six-month peacekeeping mission in Oecusse-Ambeno. In addition to security operations, the unit engaged in public relations and election-related work, including voter registration, and humanitarian assistance.

== Relationship with SOCKOR ==
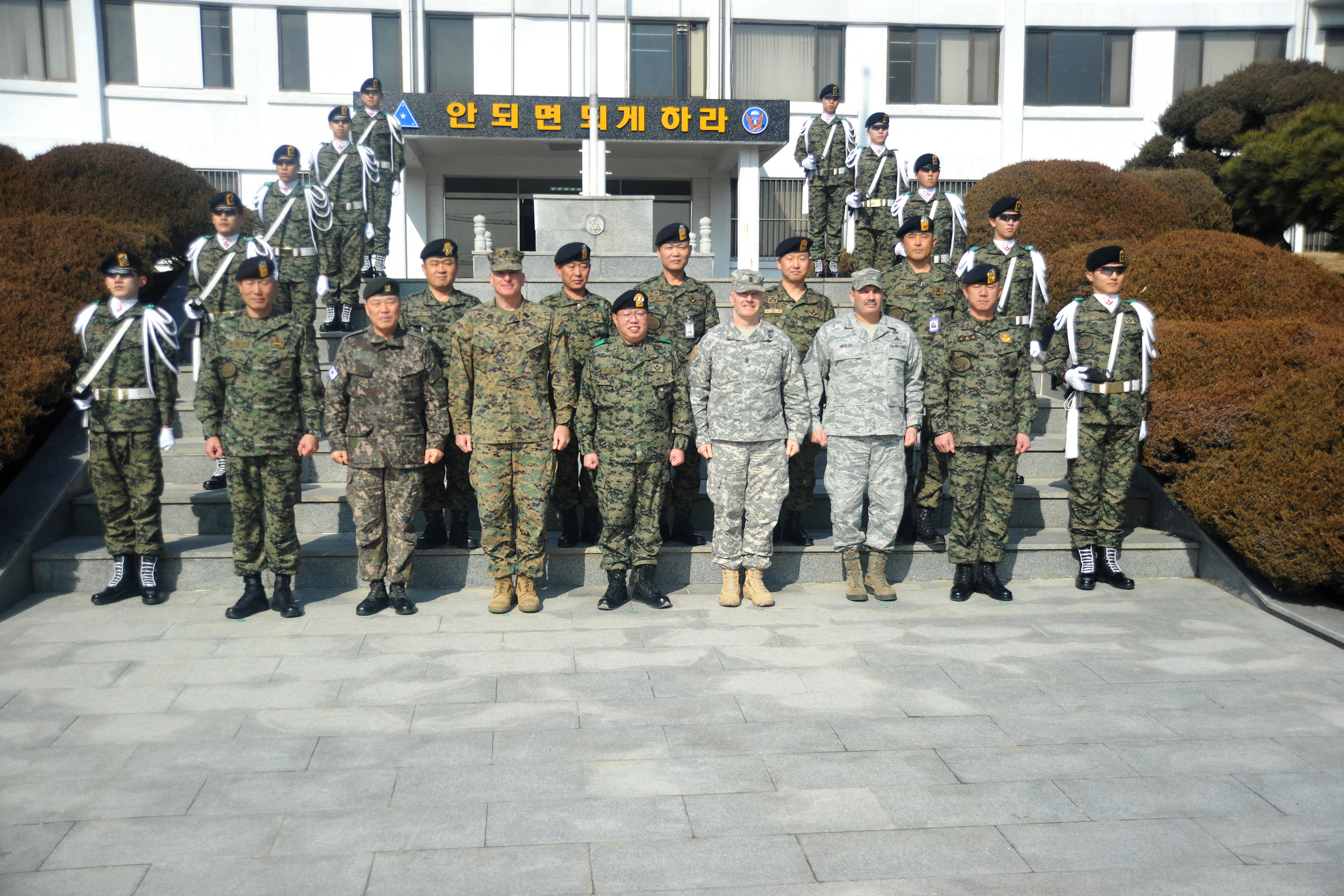
US military personnel visiting Special Warfare Command.

The members of the ROK Special Forces Brigades train and work in close partnership with members of the United States Special Operations Forces in defense of the Republic of Korea. U.S. SOF in Korea are under the command and control of Special Operations Command Korea (SOCKOR) which is a sub-unified command assigned under the Combatant Command (COCOM) of United States Special Operations Command (USSOCOM) and further delegated to the Operational Command of the United States Forces Korea (USFK) Commander.

== Equipment ==
Model	Origin	Type	Notes
M1911 pistol	South Korea	Semi-automatic pistol	Being replaced by the K5
Daewoo K5	South Korea	Semi-automatic pistol	
Daewoo K7	South Korea	Submachine gun	
Daewoo K1	South Korea	Assault rifle	Being replaced with the new K1A version
Daewoo K2	South Korea	Assault rifle	Being replaced with the new K2C version
FN SCAR	Belgium	Assault rifle	Deployed from late 2017 along with the K2C/K1A
Daewoo K3	South Korea	Light machine gun	Soon to be replaced with the K3Para
S&T Motiv K14	South Korea	Sniper rifle	

== See also ==
- Special Operations Command Korea (SOCKOR)
- United States Army Special Operations Command (USASOC) – American equivalent command
- Republic of Korea Navy Special Warfare Flotilla
