= List of reconnaissance units =

The following is a list of notable military reconnaissance units from around the world.

== Australia ==
=== Australian Army ===
- Royal Australian Regiment
  - Reconnaissance, Snipers and Surveillance Platoons
- Regional Force Surveillance Units
  - North-West Mobile Force (NORFORCE)
  - Pilbara Regiment
  - 51st Battalion, Far North Queensland Regiment
- Royal Australian Artillery
  - 20th Surveillance and Target Acquisition Regiment
- Australian Army Aviation
  - 161st Reconnaissance Squadron
  - 162nd Reconnaissance Squadron
- Royal Australian Armoured Corps
  - 1st Armoured Regiment
  - 2nd Cavalry Regiment
  - 2nd/14th Light Horse Regiment (Queensland Mounted Infantry)
  - 1st/15th Royal New South Wales Lancers
  - 4th/19th Prince of Wales's Light Horse
  - 12th/16th Hunter River Lancers
  - 3rd/9th Light Horse (South Australian Mounted Rifles)
  - 10th Light Horse Regiment
- Special Operations Command
  - Special Air Service Regiment
  - 1st Commando Regiment reconnaissance platoon
  - 2nd Commando Regiment reconnaissance platoon

=== Royal Australian Air Force ===
- Air Combat Group RAAF
  - No. 4 Squadron RAAF
- Surveillance & Response Group RAAF
  - No. 10 Squadron RAAF
  - No. 11 Squadron RAAF

=== Royal Australian Navy ===
- Clearance Diving Branch

== Brazil ==
=== Brazilian Army ===
- Amazon Military Command (CMA)
  - 3rd Special Forces Company
  - 4th Army Aviation Battalion
  - 12th Mechanized Cavalry Squadron
- Eastern Military Command (CML)
  - 2nd Guard Cavalry Regiment
  - 4th Mechanized Cavalry Squadron
  - 11th Mountain Infantry Battalion
  - Paratroopers Brigade
    - Pathfinders Company
- Northern Military Command (CMN)
  - 22nd Jungle Cavalry Squadron
  - 23rd Jungle Cavalry Squadron
  - 24th Light Infantry Battalion
- Northeastern Military Command (CMNE)
  - 10th Mechanized Cavalry Squadron
  - 16th Mechanized Cavalry Regiment
  - 19th Hunters Battalion
  - 28th Hunters Battalion
  - 23rd Hunters Battalion
  - 25th Hunters Battalion
- Planalto Military Command (CMP)
  - 1st Guard Cavalry Regiment
  - 3rd Mechanized Cavalry Squadron
  - Special Operations Command (C Op Esp)
    - 1st Commando Actions Battalion (1º BAC)
      - Snipers and Reconnaissance Detachment (1st BAC-DRC)
    - 1st Special Forces Battalion (1º B F Esp)
- Southern Military Command (CMS)
  - 3rd Guard Cavalry Regiment
  - 5th Mechanized Cavalry Squadron
  - 6th Mechanized Cavalry Squadron
  - 8th Mechanized Cavalry Squadron
  - 16th Mechanized Cavalry Squadron
- Southeastern Military Command (CMSE)
  - 1st Army Aviation Battalion
  - 2nd Army Aviation Battalion
  - 1st Light Cavalry Squadron
  - 13th Mechanized Cavalry Regiment
- Western Military Command (CMO)
  - 3rd Army Aviation Battalion
  - 10th Mechanized Cavalry Regiment
  - 11th Mechanized Cavalry Regiment
  - 17th Mechanized Cavalry Regiment
  - 20th Armored Cavalry Regiment

=== Brazilian Navy ===
- Brazilian Marine Corps (CFN)
  - 1st Riverine Operations Battalion
    - Special Operation Platoon (Pelopesp)
  - COMANF
    - 1st Special Operations Company
  - Marines Infantry Reconnaissace and Surveillance Platoons (Pelotões de Reconhecimento e Vigilância da Infantaria de fuzileiros navais)
- GRUMEC

=== Brazilian Air Force ===
- 1º/6º GAv
- 1º/10º GAv
- 1º/12º GAv
- 1º/14º GAv
- 2º/6º GAv
- 2º/7º GAv
- 3º/10º GAv
- 7º/8º GAv
- Para-SAR

== Cambodia ==
- 911th Special Forces Regiment

== Canada ==
- Pathfinders
- (1st Battalion, Royal Canadian Regiment) Infantry Recce Platoon
- (2nd Battalion, Royal Canadian Regiment) Infantry Recce Platoon
- (3rd Battalion, Royal Canadian Regiment) Airborne Infantry Recce Platoon
- (3rd Battalion, Royal Canadian Regiment) Pathfinder / Sniper Platoon
- (Canadian Special Operations Regiment) CSOR
- (Canadian Rangers) Long Range Arctic Patrol
- The Royal Canadian Dragoons (Armoured Reconnaissance)
- (12^{e} Régiment blindé du Canada) Recce Squadron
- Lord Strathcona's Horse (Royal Canadians) Recce Squadron
- (3rd Battalion, Royal 22nd Regiment) (Peloton Fantassin de Reconnaissance)
- 1st Battalion, Princess Patricia's Canadian Light Infantry Recce Platoon
- 2nd Battalion, Princess Patricia's Canadian Light Infantry Infantry Recce Platoon
- 3rd Battalion, Princess Patricia's Canadian Light Infantry Recce Platoon
- Kings Own Calgary Regiment (RCAC) Armoured Recce - Primary reserve Unit
- Queen's York Rangers (RCAC) Armoured Recce - Primary Reserve Unit
- South Alberta Light Horse (SALH) Armoured Recce - Primary Reserve Unit

== Denmark ==
- Guard Hussar Regiment
  - 3rd Reconnaissance Battalion
    - 1st Light Reconnaissance Squadron
    - 2nd Light Reconnaissance Squadron
    - 3rd Light Reconnaissance Squadron (inactive until 2023)
- Danish Home Guard
  - Home Guard Command
    - Special Support and Reconnaissance

== Finland ==
- Finnish Army
  - Armoured Brigade
    - Armoured Jäger Company
  - Guard Jaeger Regiment
    - Recon Company
  - Jaeger Brigade
    - Jaeger Recon Platoon
  - Kainuu Brigade
    - Kainuu Jaeger Recon Platoon
  - Karelia Brigade
    - Mechanized Jaeger Recon Platoon
  - Pori Brigade
    - Ostrobothnia Jäger Battalion
  - Sissi
  - Utti Jaeger Regiment
    - Paratrooper Company
- Finnish Navy
  - Nyland Brigade (NylBr)
    - Finnish Coastal Jaegers
- Finnish Air Force (FiAF)
  - No. 11 Squadron
  - No. 31 Squadron

== France ==
- French Army
  - 1st Armored Division (1re DB)
    - 9th Marine Infantry Brigade (9e BIMa)
    - 27th Mountain Infantry Brigade (27e BIM)
      - 4th Regiment of Mounted Chasseurs
  - 2nd Armoured Brigade (2e BB)
    - 12th Cuirassier Regiment (12e RC)
      - Brigade Reconnaissance Squadron (Escadron d'éclairage et d'investigation de la 2e Brigade blindée (EEI))
  - 3rd Armored Division (3e DB)
    - 2nd Dragoon Regiment (2e RD)
    - 6th Light Armoured Brigade (6e BLB)
      - 1st Spahi Regiment
      - 2nd Foreign Infantry Regiment (2e REI)
        - Reconnaissance and Support Company (CEA)
      - 21st Marine Infantry Regiment (21e RIMa)
        - Reconnaissance and Support Company (CEA)
    - 11th Parachute Brigade (11e BP)
      - 1st Parachute Hussar Regiment (1er RHP)
        - 3rd Squadron (3e Escadron)
      - 1st Parachute Chasseur Regiment (1er R.C.P)
        - Reconnaissance and Support Company (CEA)
      - 2nd Foreign Parachute Regiment (2e REP)
        - Elite Snipers Platoon (STE)
      - 3rd Marine Infantry Parachute Regiment 3e RPIMa
        - Reconnaissance and Support Company (CEA)
      - 8th Marine Infantry Parachute Regiment (8e RPIMa)
        - Reconnaissance and Support Company (CEA)
  - French Army Special Forces Command (COM FST)
    - 1st Marine Infantry Parachute Regiment (1er RPIMa)
      - 1e Compagnie
      - 4e Compagnie
    - 13th Parachute Dragoon Regiment (13e RDP)
      - Long Range Communications Squadron
  - French Army Light Aviation (ALAT)
    - 4th Airmobile Brigade (4e BAM)
      - 1st Combat Helicopter Regiment (1er RHC)
        - Reconnaissance and Attack Helicopter Squadrons
      - 3rd Combat Helicopter Regiment (3e RHC)
        - Reconnaissance and Attack Helicopter Squadrons
  - French Foreign Legion (FFL)
    - 3rd Foreign Infantry Regiment (3e REI)
      - Command and Support Company (CCS)
- French Navy
  - Commandos Marine
    - Commando de Montfort
    - Commando de Penfentenyo
- French Air and Space Force
  - 33rd Surveillance, Reconnaissance and Attack Wing
  - Air and Space Force Special Forces Brigade (BFSA)
    - Air Parachute Commando No. 10 (CPA 10)
    - Air Parachute Commando No. 30 (CPA 30)
      - Tactical Air Control Party (GCAT)
  - Air Forces Command (CFA)
    - Fighter Brigade
- National Gendarmerie
  - Air Transport Gendarmerie (GTA)
  - Maritime Gendarmerie

== Georgia ==
- Georgian Land Forces
  - Reconnaissance Battalion
- Georgian Special Operations Forces (GSOF)

== Germany ==
- German Army (Heer)
  - 1st Panzer Division
    - 9th Panzerlehr Brigade
      - 3rd Reconnaissance Demonstration Battalion
    - 21st Panzer Brigade
      - 7th Reconnaissance Battalion
    - 41st Panzergrenadier Brigade
      - 6th Reconnaissance Battalion
  - 10th Panzer Division
    - 12th Panzer Brigade
      - 8th Reconnaissance Battalion
    - 37th Panzergrenadier Brigade
      - 13h Reconnaissance Battalion
  - Heeresaufklärungstruppe
  - Rapid Forces Division
    - 23rd Mountain Brigade
      - 230th Mountain Reconnaissance Battalion
    - Deep Reconnaissance Company 200 (FSLK200)
    - EGB Forces
    - Kommando Spezialkräfte (KSK)
      - Parachutes/Air Handling Platoon
      - Special Reconnaissance Company
    - Long Range Reconnaissance Company
- German Navy (Deutsche Marine)
  - Aufklärungskompanie
  - Kampfschwimmer (KSM)
- German Air Force (Luftwaffe)
  - Kampfretter
  - Taktisches Luftwaffengeschwader 51 (formerly designated as Aufklärungsgeschwader 51)

== Greece ==
- Hellenic Army
  - 1st Armored Cavalry Battalion
  - 1st Army Aviation Brigade "Kilkis-Lachanas"
  - 1st Raider–Paratrooper Brigade "El Alamein"
  - 32nd Marines Brigade
    - 32nd Medium Tank Squadron
- Hellenic Navy
  - MYK
- Hellenic Air Force
  - 31st Search and Rescue Operations Squadron (31st SAROS)

== Ireland ==
- Army Ranger Wing (ARW)
- Cavalry Corps (CAV)
- Naval Service Diving Section (NSDS)

== Italy ==
- Carabinieri
  - 1st Carabinieri Paratroopers Regiment "Tuscania"
  - 4th Mounted Carabinieri Regiment
  - Carabinieri Heliborne Squadron "Cacciatori di Sicilia"
  - Carabinieri Mobile Units Division
  - Carabinieri Specialist Units Division
    - Carabinieri Airmobile Groupment
  - Gruppo di intervento speciale (GIS)
- Italian Army (EI)
  - Airmobile Brigade "Friuli"
    - 3rd Special Operations Helicopter Regiment "Aldebaran"
    - 4th Army Aviation Regiment "Altair"
    - 5th Army Aviation Regiment "Rigel"
  - Alpine Brigade "Julia"
    - Regiment "Piemonte Cavalleria" (2nd)
  - Alpine Brigade "Taurinense"
    - Regiment "Nizza Cavalleria" (1st)
  - Army Special Forces Command (COMFOSE)
    - 4th Alpini Paratroopers Regiment
    - 9th Paratroopers Assault Regiment "Col Moschin"
    - 185th Paratroopers Reconnaissance Target Acquisition Regiment "Folgore"
  - Bersaglieri Brigade "Garibaldi"
    - Regiment "Cavalleggeri Guide" (19th)
  - Cavalry Brigade "Pozzuolo del Friuli"
    - Lagunari Regiment "Serenissima"
      - Amphibious Reconnaissance Company
    - Regiment "Genova Cavalleria" (4th)
  - Paratroopers Brigade "Folgore"
    - Pathfinder Company "Folgore"
- Italian Navy (MM)
  - COMSUBIN
  - Italian Naval Aviation (AN)
    - 4th Helicopter Group
  - San Marco Marine Brigade
    - 1st San Marco Regiment
      - Paratroopers Swimmers Company
      - Special Operations Company
- Italian Air Force (AM)
  - 9th Intelligence, Surveillance, Target Acquisition and Reconnaissance - Electronic Warfare (ISTAR-EW) Air Brigade
  - 17th Raiders Wing
  - 154th All-weather Fighter-Bomber/All-weather Reconnaissance Fighter Squadron

== India ==
=== Indian Army ===
- Arunachal Scouts
- Ladakh Scouts
- Mechanised Infantry Regiment
  - 17th Battalion
  - 19th Battalion
  - 23rd Battalion
  - 24th Battalion
  - 25th Battalion
- Parachute Regiment
- Ghatak Platoon
- Sikkim Scouts

=== Indian Navy ===
- Indian Naval Air Arm (INAA)
  - INAS 313
  - INAS 342
  - INAS 343
  - INAS 344
  - INAS 550
- MARCOS

=== Indian Air Force ===
- Air Commands
  - Central Air Command (CAC)
    - No. 7 Squadron
    - No. 24 Squadron
    - No. 27 Squadron
  - Eastern Air Command (EAC)
    - No. 106 Squadron
  - Southern Air Command (SAC)
    - No. 109 Helicopter Unit
  - South Western Air Command (SWAC)
    - No. 4 Squadron
    - No. 6 Squadron
    - No. 31 Squadron
  - Western Air Command (WAC)
    - No. 3 Squadron
    - No. 131 Helicopter Flight
    - No. 132 Helicopter Flight
- Garud Commando Force

=== Paramilitary forces ===
- Assam Rifles (AR)
- Border Security Force (BSF)
- COBRA
- Indo-Tibetan Border Police (ITBP)
- Sashastra Seema Bal (SSB)
- Special Frontier Force (SFF)

== Indonesia ==
- 3rd Group Sandi Yudha, Army Special Forces Command (Kopassus)
- 2nd Special Operations Detachment, Navy Special Forces (Kopaska)
- Amphibious Reconnassiance Battalion (Taifib), Indonesian Marine Corps
- Cavalry Reconnaissance Company (Kikavtai), Cavalry Corps, Indonesian Army
- Combat Reconnaissance Platoon, Kostrad, Indonesian Army
- Pathfinder Platoon (Pleton Pandu Udara), Airborne Brigade, Indonesian Army
- Paskhas, Indonesian Air Force

== Israel ==
- Ground Forces
  - Infantry Corps (Battalions)
    - Brigade Reconnaissance Battalions & Companies
      - 93rd Reconnaissance Battalion – Kfir Brigade
      - 631st Reconnaissance Battalion – Golani Brigade
      - 846th Reconnaissance Battalion – Givati Brigade
      - 934th Reconnaissance Battalion – Nahal Brigade
      - 5135th Reconnaissance Battalion – Paratroopers Brigade
      - Reserve Brigades Reconnaissance Battalions
    - Oz Brigade (Commandos)
      - Maglan Unit
      - Egoz Unit
      - Duvdevan Unit
    - Multidimensional Unit
  - Armoured Corps (Companies)
    - Palsar 7 – the 7th Armored Brigade reconnaissance unit.
    - Palsar 401 – the 401st Brigade reconnaissance unit.
    - Palsar 188 – the 188th Armored Brigade reconnaissance unit. (Reserve)
    - Reserve Brigades Reconnaissance Companies
  - Combat Engineer Corps
    - Battalion Recon/Scout Platoons
    - Unit Yahalom (Generally referred to as a commando unit)
      - Sayeret Yael
  - Combat Intelligence Collection Corps
    - Infantry Forces "YAHMAM"
  - Artillery Corps
    - Unit Sky Rider
- Sayeret Matkal
- Air Force
  - 7th Wing
    - Shaldag
- Navy
  - Shayetet 13
- Military Intelligence Directorate
  - Special Operations Command
    - Sayeret Matkal
  - Collective Units
    - Unit 8200
      - Field SIGINT Collection Unit

== Japan ==
- Japan Ground Self-Defense Force (JGSDF)
  - Ground Component Command (GCC)
    - Amphibious Rapid Deployment Brigade (ARDB)
      - Reconnaissance Battalion
    - Central Army
      - 3rd Division
        - 3rd Reconnaissance Combat Battalion
      - 10th Division
        - 10th Reconnaissance Combat Battalion
      - 13th Brigade
        - 13th Reconnaissance Combat Battalion
      - 14th Brigade
        - 14th Reconnaissance Company
      - Central Army Aviation Group
        - Central Army Helicopter Battalion
    - Eastern Army
      - 1st Division
        - 1st Reconnaissance Combat Battalion
      - 12th Brigade
        - 12th Reconnaissance Company
      - Eastern Army Aviation Group
        - Eastern Army Helicopter Battalion
    - Northern Army
      - 1st Anti-Aircraft Artillery Brigade
        - 101st Unmanned Aerial Vehicles Battery
      - 2nd Division
        - 2nd Reconnaissance Company
      - 5th Brigade
        - 5th Reconnaissance Company
      - 7th Division
        - 7th Reconnaissance Company
      - 11th Brigade
        - 11th Reconnaissance Company
      - Northern Army Aviation Group
        - Northern Army Helicopter Battalion
    - North Eastern Army
      - 6th Division
        - 6th Reconnaissance Company
      - 9th Division
        - 9th Reconnaissance Combat Battalion
      - North Eastern Army Aviation Group
        - North Eastern Army Helicopter Battalion
    - Western Army
      - 4th Division
        - 4th Reconnaissance Combat Battalion
      - 8th Division
        - 8th Reconnaissance Company
      - 15th Brigade
        - 15th Reconnaissance Company
      - Western Army Aviation Group
        - Western Army Helicopter Battalion
- Japan Maritime Self-Defense Force (JMSDF)
  - Fleet Air Force
    - Fleet Air Wing 31
      - Air Reconnaissance Squadron 81
  - Special Boarding Unit (SBU)

== Laos ==
- 426th Special Forces Company

== Myanmar ==
- Myanmar Army
  - Armoured Reconnaissance Battalions
  - Light Infantry Reconnaissance Company
  - Pathfinders Company
  - Special Forces Brigades
- Myanmar Navy
  - Myanmar Navy SEALs

== Netherlands ==
- 11 BVE, 42 BVE, 43 BVE (brigade reconnaissance squadrons)
- 104 JVE (Ground-Based Long-Range Recce Squadrons), Joint ISTAR Command (JISTARC)
- Pathfinders (Airmobile)
- Korps Commandotroepen
- C-Squadron, Maritime Special Operations Forces, includes Mountain Leader Reconnaissance Platoon and Amphibious Reconnaissance Platoon
- 15 RSTA Squadron, 25 RSTA Squadron of the Marine Combat Groups, RNLMC.
- Reconnaissance Platoons of RNLA Infantry Battalions.

== New Zealand ==
- Waikato Mounted Rifles
- NZSAS
- Reconnaissance Platoon, Royal New Zealand Infantry Regiment

== North Korea ==
- Korean People's Army (KPA)
  - I Corps
    - Reconnaissance Battalion
  - XI Corps
    - 17th Reconnaissance Brigade
  - Korean People's Army Special Operations Forces (KPASOF)
- Korean People's Navy (KPANF)
  - Naval Commandos

== Philippines ==
- 32nd Maritime Patrol & Reconnaissance Squadron
- 71st Maritime Unmanned Aerial Reconnaissance Squadron (71st MUARS)
- Armor "Pambato" Division
- Aviation "Hiraya" Regiment
- Division Reconnaissance Company (DRC)
- Marine Scout Snipers (MSS)
- Force Reconnaissance Group (FRG)
- Naval Special Operations Command (NAVSOCOM)
- Scout Rangers

== Portugal ==
- 3rd Cavalry Regiment (RC3)
  - 1st Reconnaissance Platoon (1PelRec)
  - 2nd Reconnaissance Platoon (2PelRec)
- 5th Artillery Regiment (RA5)
  - Information, Surveillance, Target Acquisition, and Reconnaissance Surveillance Systems Company
- 6th Cavalry Regiment (RC6)
  - Recognition Group (GRec)
- Air-Land Pathfinders Company (Precs)
- Commando Regiment
- Core of Tactical Operations of Protection (NOTP)
- CTOE
- DAE
- GOE
- Mechanized Brigade Command
  - Reconnaissance Squadron (ERec)
- Navy's Helicopter Squadron

== Russia ==
- Federal Security Service "FSB"
  - Alpha Group Directorate "A" of the FSB Special Purpose Center (TsSN FSB), is an elite, stand-alone sub-unit of Russia's special forces.
  - Vympel Group Directorate "B" Vympel Group is an elite Russian spetsnaz unit under the command of the FSB. (TsSN FSB)
- Armed Forces of the Russian Federation
  - Spetsnaz GRU: 2nd, 3rd, 10th, 14th, 16th, 24th, 25th Spetsnaz Brigade (obrSpN)
  - 45th Detached Reconnaissance Regiment Specnaz VDV (orpSpN)
  - Russian commando frogmen: 42nd, 420th, 431th, 561th Naval Reconnaissance Spetsnaz Point (omrpSpN)
  - Voennaa Razvedka (Razvedchiki Scouts) "Military intelligence" personnel/units within larger formations in ground troops, airborne troops and marines. Intelligence battalion in the division, reconnaissance company in the brigade, a reconnaissance platoon in the regiment. The level of training is the same as Spetsnaz GRU but not controlled by the GRU. Mascot: bat.

== Serbia ==
- 72nd Brigade for Special Operations
- 126th Air Surveillance, Early Warning and Guidance Brigade (VOJIN)
- 353rd Reconnaissance Squadron
- Armored Reconnaissance Battalion (Niš)

== South Africa ==
- 1 Special Service Battalion
- 10 Squadron SAAF
- 44 Pathfinder Platoon
- South African Special Forces (Recces)

== South Korea ==
- Republic of Korea Army (ROKA)
  - Army Aviation Command (AAC)
    - 1st Combat Aviation Brigade
      - 111th Aviation Battalion
      - 502nd Aviation Battalion
  - Army Capital Defense Command (ACDC)
    - 35th Special Mission Battalion
    - 52nd Infantry Division
      - Reconnaissance Battalion
    - 56th Infantry Division
      - Reconnaissance Battalion
  - Army Mobilization Force Command (AMFC)
    - 60th Infantry Division
      - Reconnaissance Battalion
    - 66th Infantry Division
      - Reconnaissance Battalion
    - 72nd Infantry Division
      - Reconnaissance Battalion
    - 73rd Infantry Division
      - Reconnaissance Battalion
    - 75th Infantry Division
      - Reconnaissance Battalion
  - Ground Operations Command (GOC)
    - 36th Infantry Division
      - Reconnaissance Battalion
    - 55th Infantry Division
      - Reconnaissance Battalion
    - Capital Corps
      - 700th Commando Regiment
    - I Corps
      - 1st Infantry Division
        - Reconnaissance Battalion
      - 2nd Armored Brigade
        - Armored Reconnaissance Company
      - 9th Infantry Division
        - Reconnaissance Battalion
      - 25th Infantry Division
        - Reconnaissance Battalion
      - 30th Armored Brigade
        - Armored Reconnaissance Company
      - 701st Commando Regiment
    - II Corps
      - 7th Infantry Division
        - Reconnaissance Battalion
      - 15th Infantry Division
        - Reconnaissance Battalion
      - 702nd Commando Regiment
    - III Corps
      - 1st Mountain Brigade
        - Reconnaissance Company
      - 12th Infantry Division
        - Reconnaissance Battalion
      - 20th Armored Brigade
        - Armored Reconnaissance Company
      - 21st Infantry Division
        - Reconnaissance Battalion
      - 22nd Infantry Division
        - Reconnaissance Battalion
      - 102nd Armored Brigade
        - Armored Reconnaissance Company
      - 703rd Commando Regiment
    - VII Maneuver Corps
      - 1st Air Assault Battalion
        - 1st Air Assault Reconnaissance Platoon
      - 2nd Air Assault Battalion
        - 2nd Air Assault Reconnaissance Platoon
      - 8th Maneuver Division
        - Armored Reconnaissance Battalion
      - 11th Maneuver Division
        - Armored Reconnaissance Battalion
      - Capital Mechanized Infantry Division
        - Armored Reconnaissance Battalion
  - Army 2nd Operations Command
    - 31st Infantry Division
      - Reconnaissance Battalion
    - 32nd Infantry Division
      - Reconnaissance Battalion
    - 35th Infantry Division
      - Reconnaissance Battalion
    - 37th Infantry Division
      - Reconnaissance Battalion
- Republic of Korea Navy (ROKN)
  - Naval Air Command
  - Republic of Korea Marine Corps (ROKMC)
    - 1st Marine Division
      - 1st Reconnaissance Battalion
    - 2nd Marine Division
      - 2nd Reconnaissance Battalion
    - 6th Marine Brigade
      - 6th Reconnaissance Company
    - Special Reconnaissance Battalion (SRB)
  - Republic of Korea Navy Special Warfare Flotilla (WARFLOT)
    - Naval Special Warfare Group (NSWG)
- Republic of Korea Air Force (ROKAF)
  - Air Mobility & Reconnaissance Command (AMRC)
    - 39th Reconnaissance Wing
  - Combat Control Team (CCT)
  - Special Air Force Rescue Team (SAFRT)

== Sweden ==
- Life Regiment Hussars, 32nd Intelligence Battalion (ISTAR)
- Norrland Dragoon Regiment (I 19), Army Ranger Battalion
- 1st Marine Regiment (Amf 1), 202nd Coastal Ranger Company
- Swedish Air Force, Swedish Air Force Rangers
- Swedish Home Guard, Home Guard reconnaissance companies

== Thailand ==
- Royal Thai Army (RTA)
  - 3rd Reconnaissance Cavalry Company (3rd RCC)
  - 4th Reconnaissance Cavalry Company (4th RCC)
  - 5th Reconnaissance Cavalry Company (5th RCC)
  - 6th Reconnaissance Cavalry Company (6th RCC)
  - 30th Cavalry Squadron, 2nd Infantry Division, Queen Sirikit's Guard
  - 31st Infantry Regiment, King Bhumibol's Guard
    - Reconnaissance Patrol Company (RPC)
  - Long Range Reconnaissance Patrols Company (LRRP)
- Royal Thai Navy (RTN)
  - Royal Thai Navy SEALs
  - RTMC Reconnaissance Battalion (RECON)
- Royal Thai Air Force (RTAF)
  - 402 Elint Reconnaissance Squadron (402 ERS)
  - Special Operations Regiment (SOR)

== Turkey ==
- General Staff of the Turkish Armed Forces (TSKGB)
  - ÖKK
- Turkish Land Forces (TKK)
  - Armored Brigade
  - Army Aviation Regiment
  - Commando Brigades
  - Cyprus Turkish Peace Force Command (KTBKK)
    - 49th Special Force Regiment (49th SFR)
  - Hakkari Mountain and Commando Brigade
- Turkish Naval Forces (TDK)
  - SAS
  - SAT
- Turkish Air Force (THK)
  - Personel Kurtarma

== United Kingdom ==
=== British Army ===
- Light Cavalry & Armoured Cavalry Regiments
  - Household Cavalry Regiment
  - 1st The Queen's Dragoon Guards & Royal Yeomanry
  - Royal Scots Dragoon Guards & Scottish & North Irish Yeomanry
  - Royal Dragoon Guards
  - Royal Lancers (Queen Elizabeth’s own)
  - The Light Dragoons & Queen's Own Yeomanry
- Infantry Battalion Reconnaissance Platoons
- 4/73 (Sphinx) Special Observation Post Battery RA
- Honourable Artillery Company
- Pathfinder Platoon, 16 Air Assault Brigade
- Patrol Platoon, 2nd Battalion, Parachute Regiment
- Patrol Platoon, 3rd Battalion, Parachute Regiment
- Reconnaissance Corps
- Special Air Service
- Special Reconnaissance Regiment
- Special Reconnaissance Unit

=== Royal Navy ===
- Brigade Reconnaissance Force, Royal Marines
- Reconnaissance Troop (40 Commando, 3 Commando Brigade, Royal Marine Corps, His Majesty's Naval Service)
- Reconnaissance Troop (42 Commando, 3 Commando Brigade, Royal Marine Corps, His Majesty's Naval Service)
- Reconnaissance Troop (45 Commando, 3 Commando Brigade, Royal Marine Corps, His Majesty's Naval Service)
- Mountain Leader Training Cadre
- Special Boat Service

=== Royal Air Force ===
- No. 5 Squadron RAF
- No. 51 Squadron RAF

== United States ==
=== United States Army ===
- United States Army Infantry Scouts and Special Reconnaissance Platoons
- United States Army Special Operations Command
  - United States Army Special Forces (Green Berets)
  - SOT-A (Special Operations Team-Alpha)
  - Combat Applications Group (Delta Force)
  - 75th Ranger Regiment
- U.S. Army Infantry Battalion Reconnaissance Platoons
- U.S. Army Field Artillery Advance Party Teams
- Army Cavalry Scouts

=== United States Marine Corps ===
- United States Marine Corps Special Operations Command (MARSOC)
- Marine Force Reconnaissance
- Marine Division Reconnaissance
- Surveillance and Target Acquisition (STA) Platoon
- Scout-Sniper Platoon
- Light Armored Reconnaissance
- Radio Battalion
- United States Marine Corps Field Artillery Advance Party Teams

=== United States Air Force ===
- United States Air Force Special Tactics

=== United States Navy ===
- United States Navy SEALs
- Navy SWCC
- Special amphibious reconnaissance corpsman

== Vietnam ==
=== Vietnam People's Army ===
Each Corps and Military Region in VPA have 1 Recon Battalion. In each Battalion have 2 Land Recon Companies or 2 Mechanical Recon Companies and 1 Special Recon Company.

- 701st Special Recon Battalion of 1st Corps
- 1st Special Recon Battalion of 2nd Corps
- 28th Special Recon Battalion of 3rd Corps
- 46th Special Recon Battalion of 4th Corps
- 20th Recon Battalion of High Command of Capital Hanoi
- 31st Recon Battalion of 1st Military Region
- 20th Recon Battalion of 2nd Military Region
- 31st Recon Battalion of 3rd Military Region
- 12th Recon Battalion of 4th Military Region
- 32nd Recon Battalion of 5th Military Region
- 47th Recon Battalion of 7th Military Region
- Recon Battalion under the staff HQ of 9th Military Region

Beside, each Army Division, independent Regiment, Commando Brigade and provincial military command also have 1 Recon Company.
