= Republic of Korea Army Ground Operations Command =

Ground Operations Command
- 지상작전사령부
- Active: 15 December 1953 - 31 December 2018 (1st Army); 1 January 2019 - present
- Country: Republic of Korea
- Branch: Republic of Korea Army
- Type: Component command
- Garrison/HQ: Yongin, Gyeonggi Province
- Nicknames: 선봉대 ("The Vanguard")

Commanders
- Current commander: General Son Sik

- Republic of Korea Army Ground Operations Command
- Hangul: 지상작전사령부
- Hanja: 地上作戰司令部
- RR: Jisang jakjeon saryeongbu
- MR: Chisang chakchŏn saryŏngbu

The Ground Operations Command (GOC; Korean: 지상작전사령부) is a command of the Republic of Korea Army, based in Yongin, Gyeonggi Province.

== History ==
According Lee Min-hyung of The Korea Times, the Ministry of National Defense pushed for the establishment of the Ground Operations Command since 1998, with calls to decrease the number of soldiers and improve operational efficiency under a single control point.

In 2015, the government announced its intention to establish a command to be in charge of the army's ground operations by 2018, after delaying the transfer of control of troops in case of war.

The Ground Operations Command has been created by combining the ROK Army's First and Third Army commands, which defended the eastern and western frontline areas. The establishment of the command was part of President Moon Jae-in's military reform plan. On 16 April 2020, Special Operations Commander, Lieutenant General Nam Young-sin, was promoted to General and appointed as the Ground Operations Commander.

== Mission ==
According to General Woon-yong Kim, the mission entrusted to the Ground Operations Command consists of deterring the full spectrum of threats by maintaining watertight readiness posture even outside open wartime. To this end, the Ground Operations Command guards the Military Demarcation Line in combat readiness.

In the event of an outbreak of war, the Ground Operations Command will serve as the Ground Component Command under the combined forces command of South Korea and the United States.

== Structure ==
The Ground Operations Command consists of:

=== Direct (직할부대) ===
- Headquarters Unit
- Ground Information Group
- 36th Infantry Division
- 55th Infantry Division
- Fires Brigade
- 11th Artillery Group
- 1101st Engineer Group

=== Attached (예하부대) ===
- Capital Corps
- I Corps
- II Corps
- III Corps
- V Corps
- VII Maneuver Corps
- 1st Logistic Support Command
  - Capital Logistic Support Group
  - 6th Logistic Support Group
  - 7th Logistic Support Group
  - 8th Logistic Support Group
  - Information Communication Brigade

==== Capital Corps ====
- Direct
  - Headquarters Unit
  - 700th Commando Regiment
  - 140th Intelligence Battalion
  - 100th Signal Group
  - 1175th Engineer Corps
  - 3rd Security Group
  - 10th Aviation Group
  - 10th CBRN Battalion
- Attached
  - 17th Infantry Division
  - 51st Infantry Division
  - Capital Artillery Brigade

==== I Corps ====
- Direct
  - Headquarters Unit
  - 701st Commando Regiment
  - 141st Intelligence Battalion
  - 101st Signal Group
  - 301st Security Regiment
  - 11th Aviation Group
  - 11th CBRN Battalion
- Attached
  - 1st Infantry Division
  - 9th Infantry Division
  - 25th Infantry Division
  - 2nd Armored Brigade
  - 30th Armored Brigade
  - 1st Engineer Brigade
  - 1st Artillery Brigade
  - 1st Logistic Support Brigade

==== II Corps ====
- Direct
  - Headquarters Unit
  - 702nd Commando Regiment
  - 142nd Intelligence Battalion
  - 102nd Signal Group
  - 302nd Security Group
  - 12nd Aviation Group
  - 12th CBRN Battalion
- Attached
  - 7th Infantry Division
  - 15th Infantry Division
  - 3rd Armored Brigade
  - 2nd Engineer Brigade
  - 2nd Artillery Brigade
  - 2nd Logistic Support Brigade

==== III Corps ====
- Direct
  - Headquarters Unit
  - 703rd Commando Regiment
  - 143rd Intelligence Battalion
  - 103rd Signal Group
  - 303th Security Regiment
  - 13rd Aviation Group
  - 13th CBRN Battalion
- Attached
  - 1st Mountain Brigade
  - 12th Infantry Division
  - 21st Infantry Division
  - 22nd Infantry Division
  - 23rd Security Brigade
  - 20th Armored Brigade
  - 102nd Armored Brigade
  - 3rd Engineer Brigade
  - 3rd Artillery Brigade
  - 3rd Logistic Support Brigade

==== V Corps ====
- Direct
  - Headquarters Unit
  - 705th Commando Regiment
  - 145th Intelligence Battalion
  - 105th Signal Group
  - 305th Security Regiment
  - 15th Aviation Group
  - 15th CBRN Battalion
- Attached
  - 3rd Infantry Division
  - 5th Infantry Division
  - 6th Infantry Division
  - 28th Infantry Division (will be disbanded in 2025)
  - 1st Armored Brigade
  - 5th Armored Brigade
  - 5th Engineer Brigade
  - 5th Artillery Brigade
  - 5th Logistic Support Brigade

==== VII Maneuver Corps ====
- Direct
  - Headquarters Unit
  - 1st Air Assault Battalion
  - 2nd Air Assault Battalion
  - 107th Signal Group
  - 17th Aviation Group
  - 17th CBRN Battalion
- Attached
  - Capital Mechanized Infantry Division
  - 2nd Quick Response Division
  - 8th Maneuver Division
  - 11th Maneuver Division
  - 7th Engineer Brigade
  - 7th Artillery Brigade
  - 7th Logistic Support Group (belongs to 1st Logistic Support Command)
