= List of divisions of the South Korean Army =

This article is a list of current and former divisions of the South Korean Army.

| Insignia | Division | Formation Date | Disbandment Date | Conflicts |
|---|---|---|---|---|
| | Capital Mechanized Infantry Division | June 20, 1948 | N/A | Korean War; Vietnam War; Iraq War |
| | 1st Infantry Division | December 1, 1947 | N/A | Korean War |
| | 2nd Quick Response Division | May 12, 1949 | N/A | Korean War |
| | 3rd Infantry Division | May 12, 1949 | N/A | Korean War |
| | 5th Infantry Division | April 29, 1948 | N/A | Korean War |
| | 6th Infantry Division | June 14, 1948 | N/A | Korean War |
| | 7th Infantry Division | June 10, 1949 | N/A | Korean War |
| | 8th Maneuver Division | June 20, 1949 | N/A | Korean War |
| | 9th Infantry Division | October 25, 1950 | N/A | Korean War |
| | 11th Maneuver Division | August 27, 1950 | N/A | Korean War |
| | 12th Infantry Division | November 8, 1952 | N/A | Korean War |
| | 15th Infantry Division | November 8, 1952 | N/A | Korean War |
| | 17th Infantry Division | March 20, 1955 | N/A | None |
| | 21st Infantry Division | January 15, 1953 | N/A | 1976 Gamu-ri incursion 1979 Daeamsan Mountain incursion 1997 Gachilbong Peak incursion |
| | 22nd Infantry Division | April 21, 1953; August 1, 1975 | December 24, 1958 (later reformed) | None |
| | 25th Infantry Division | April 21, 1953 | N/A | 1974 Korean DMZ tunnel incident |
| | 26th Mechanized Infantry Division | June 18, 1953 | November 30, 2018 | None |
| | 36th Infantry Division | April 20, 1955 | N/A | None |
| | 50th Infantry Division | June 18, 1955 | N/A | 1979 South Korean coup d'état |
| | 51st Infantry Division | August 16, 1982 | N/A | None |
| | 52nd Homeland Defense Infantry Division | January 7, 1984 | N/A | None |
| | 60th Infantry Division | June 1, 1990 | N/A | None |
