= 20th Armoured Brigade =

20th Armoured Brigade may refer to:

- 20th Light Armoured Brigade, United Kingdom, active 1939–1943 during WWII
- 20th Armoured Brigade (United Kingdom), formed in 1950
- 20th Armored Brigade (South Korea)

== See also ==
- 20th Brigade (disambiguation)
