= 51st Infantry Division (South Korea) =

Military formation

51st Homeland Defense Infantry Division
- 제51향토보병사단
- Active: 16 August 1982 – present
- Country: South Korea
- Branch: Republic of Korea Army
- Type: Infantry
- Size: Division
- Part of: Ground Operations Command
- Garrison/HQ: Hwaseong, Gyeonggi Province
- Nickname: Total Victory

Commanders
- Current commander: Maj. Gen. Son Dae-gwon

The 51st Homeland Defense Infantry Division (Korean: 제51향토보병사단) is a military formation of the Republic of Korea Army. The division is subordinated to the Ground Operations Command. It is in charge of local defense and reserve force training in the southwestern part of Gyeonggi. The division founded on 16 August 1982 when it was separated from the 17th Infantry Division. The division headquarters is located in Hwaseong, Gyeonggi Province.

== Organization ==
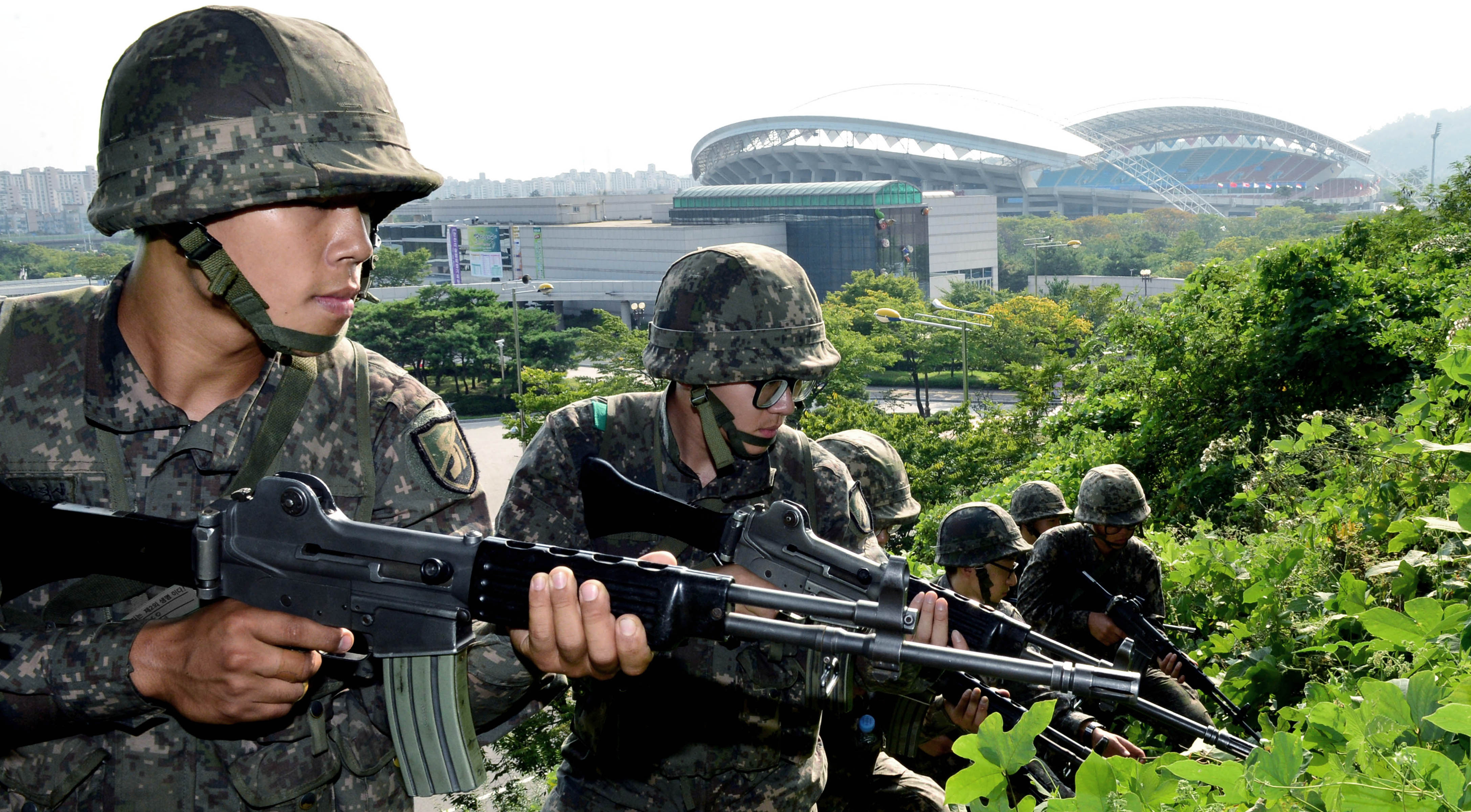
Soldiers from 51st Infantry Division patrolling during 2014 Asian Games.

- Headquarters:
  - Reconnaissance Battalion
  - Engineer Battalion
  - Mobile Battalion
  - Artillery Battalion
  - Signal Battalion
  - Support Battalion
  - Military Police Battalion
  - Medical Battalion
  - Intelligence Battalion
  - Chemical Company
  - Air Defense Company
  - Headquarters Company
- 167th Infantry Brigade
- 168th Infantry Brigade
- 169th Infantry Brigade
