= Kim Ho-bok =

- 김호복

Commander of the VII Maneuver Corps
- Incumbent
- Assumed office 20 April 2023
- President: Yoon Suk Yeol
- Preceded by: Koh Hyeon-seok

Personal details
- Education: Korea Army Academy at Yeongcheon

Military service
- Allegiance: South Korea
- Branch/service: Republic of Korea Army
- Years of service: 1990–Present
- Rank: Lieutenant General
- Commands: VII Maneuver Corps

Kim Ho-bok (Korean: 김호복) is a South Korean Army Lieutenant General who is serving as the commander of the VII Maneuver Corps.

== Biography ==
After graduating from the 27th class of Korea Army Academy at Yeongcheon in 1990, he was commissioned as second Lieutenant in the army.

In May 2021, Kim Ho-bok was appointed as the commander of the 52nd Infantry Division. On April 14, 2023, Kim was promoted to lieutenant general. On April 20, he was appointed as the 37th commander of the VII Maneuver Corps, replacing Koh Hyeon-seok.
