= III Corps (South Korea) =

- Active: 16 October 1950–25 May 1951; May 1953–Present
- Country: Republic of Korea
- Branch: Republic of Korea Army
- Role: Offensive force
- Part of: Ground Operations Command
- Engagements: Korean War: Battle of Pusan Perimeter; Chinese Spring Offensive

Commanders
- Notable commanders: Lieutenant General Song Yo-chan; Major General Yu Jae-hung

The III Corps is a corps of the Republic of Korea Army that was formed on October 16, 1950. One of its commanders was Major General Yu Jae Hung.

== History ==
=== Korean War ===
When the Corps was formed it initially consisted of the 5th and 11th Infantry Division. Its responsibility was to mop up any enemy stragglers bypass after the break out of The Pusan Perimeter.

==== Battle for Wonju ====
Before General Walker's death in an automobile accident, he had attempted to strengthen the UN defense of the 38th parallel. The ROK III Corps defended the 38th parallel north of Gapyeong (Kapyong) and Chuncheon, the II Corps was placed in the center, and the I Corps was deployed on the east coast. By January 1, 1951, they had been broken down by constant guerrilla attacks and all out infantry assaults. They were sent into full retreat. Their sector was handed over to US X Corps.

==== Second Spring Offensive ====
During The Second Spring Offensive they took heavy casualties at Namjon on May 16, 1951. The People's Volunteer Army of China with three field armies and over 700,000 men heavily outnumbered the defending III Corps. The attack was initially successful but was halted by May 20, 1951. At the time of the offensive the Corp consisted of the 3rd and 9th Infantry Division which withdrew leaving behind their heavy equipment, they scattered and fled south on foot through the Pangdae Mountain. On May 25, 1951, III Corps was disbanded by order of General Van Fleet and reassigned 3rd and 9th Infantry Division to The ROK I Corp and the US X Corp respectively.

=== Armistice ===
In May 1953 III Corps was reformed under Major General Kang Mun Bong and deployed to Kwandae to be trained under US X Corps. In October 1953 when X Corps withdrew, III Corps assumed the responsibility of defending along the east and central front from Pukhan River to the Punchbowl.

== Structure ==
- Direct
  - Headquarters Unit
  - 703rd Commando Regiment
  - 143rd Intelligence Battalion
  - 103rd Signal Group
  - 303rd Security Regiment
  - 13th Aviation Group
  - 13th CBRN Battalion
- Attached
  - 1st Mountain Brigade
  - 12th Infantry Division
  - 21st Infantry Division
  - 22nd Infantry Division
  - 23rd Security Brigade
  - 20th Armored Brigade
  - 102nd Armored Brigade
  - 3rd Engineer Brigade
  - 3rd Artillery Brigade
  - 3rd Logistic Support Brigade
