= Kang Mun-bong =

South Korean military officer (1923–1988)

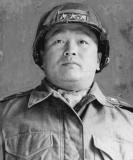
- Lt. Gen. Kang Mun-bong in 1954
- Born: October 26, 1923; Kankyōnan Province, Korea, Empire of Japan
- Died: February 26, 1988 (aged 64); Los Angeles, California, United States

Korean name
- Hangul: 강문봉
- Hanja: 姜文奉
- RR: Gang Munbong
- MR: Kang Munbong

Kang Mun-bong (Korean: 강문봉; October 26, 1923 – February 26, 1988) was a South Korean military officer.

Kang takes credit for lessening the North Korean army's defenses by deflecting the army to the Honam area.

He was well known and highly regarded as a hero after the Korean War. However, due to corruption and conspiracy charges, he was forced to live the final days of his life in the United States.

== Biography ==
He was born October 26, 1923, in Korea during the Japanese colonial period in South Hamgyong Province, which is now part of North Korea.

=== Korean War ===
In 1952, Kang became the commander of the ROK 1st Division and he achieved the rank of major general during the Korean War. Was picked by President Rhee, Seungman to attend the U.S. War College in Ft. Leavenworth, Kansas during the Korean War with General Chung, Il Kwon. He was in charge of reforming the III Corps in 1953. Kang was then trained under the US Army X Corps. When the US X Corps pulled out, Kang and his men were in charge of defending key areas in the war. They were responsible for defending the area from the Punchbowl to the Pukhan River. General Kang then formed the Second Republic of Korean Army and became its first Commanding Officer.

=== Trial for conspiracy ===
Even though Kang played a large role in the Republic of Korean Army's general staff as their chief of operations, there was suspicion relating to his involvement in Kim Chang-Yong's assassination and other NDC corruption charges. Kang was put on trial in Taegu, where he was found guilty and sentenced to death. However, this sentence was changed due to his success and influence in the Korean War. He was released from prison in 1960, after the April Revolution. Kang never confessed to participating in the assassination of Kim Chang-Yong, regardless of the court's decision.

=== Move to the United States ===
After his release from prison, Kang moved to the United States and attended George Washington University for a few years.

While serving his life sentence, he wrote a book about his life called A Study on the top Korean military leadership during the Korean War which was then published in Seoul in 1983. This contains the most information about his life, but it was not widely circulated.

Kang died February 26, 1988, in Los Angeles, CA.
