= Son Sik =

- 손식

Personal details
- Born: 1968 (age 57–58)
- Education: Korea Military Academy

Military service
- Allegiance: South Korea
- Branch/service: Republic of Korea Army
- Years of service: 1990–Present
- Rank: General
- Commands: Republic of Korea Army Ground Operations Command

Son Sik (Korean: 손식) is a South Korean Army general who serves as the commander of the Republic of Korea Army Ground Operations Command and commander of the Republic of Korea Army Special Warfare Command.
