= Kim Chang-ryong =

Murdered South Korean spymaster

Lieutenant General Kim Chang-ryong
- Colonel Kim, early 1950s

Personal details
- Born: July 18, 1920 Kinya-gun, Kankyōnan Province, Korea, Empire of Japan
- Died: January 30, 1956 (aged 35) Yongsan, Seoul, South Korea
- Cause of death: Assassination by gunshot
- Nickname: Human Hunter

Military service
- Allegiance: Empire of Japan; South Korea
- Branch/service: Kwantung Military Police; Republic of Korea Army
- Years of service: 1940-1956
- Rank: Sergeant (IJA); Lieutenant General (posthumous)
- Commands: Counterintelligence Corps; Joint Investigation Headquarters; Busan District Joint Investigation Bureau
- Battles/wars: Second Sino-Japanese War; Yeosu-Suncheon Rebellion; Korean War

Korean name
- Hangul: 김창룡
- Hanja: 金昌龍
- RR: Gim Changryong
- MR: Kim Ch'angnyong

Kim Chang-ryong (Korean: 김창룡; July 18, 1920 – January 30, 1956) was a Japanese collaborator, high-ranking officer in the Republic of Korea Army, the head of the Korean Counterintelligence Corps, and South Korean President Syngman Rhee's most trusted right-hand man. He was assassinated in 1956 by colleagues from the army.

== Early life ==
He was born in 1920 to a poor peasant family in Kinya-gun, Kankyōnan Province, Korea, Empire of Japan. Like many other young Koreans, he joined the Imperial Japanese Army in Manchukuo. At first serving in the military police, he soon became a reputed detective whose job was to uncover moles in the Japanese intelligence service and to hunt communists.

In 1941, Kim cunningly assumed the appearance of a beggar to get close to Wang Jinli (王近禮), an infamous Chinese spymaster. After gaining the latter's trust by having himself intentionally arrested several times in the process, he was able to gather intelligence allowing the Japanese military to neutralize a spy network of about 60 agents from the Soviet Union.

== Return ==
After the surrender of Japan and subsequent independence of Korea in 1945, Kim returned to his hometown, Hamhung, finding it to be under Soviet occupation. Wanted by the Communists for being a former Japanese soldier, he had to keep a low profile. Around the end of 1945, he visited a friend and former assistant Kim Yun-won (金允元) in Chorwon, who betrayed him; he was sentenced to death for "anti-Korean deeds" and for arresting anti-Japanese combatants. While Kim was being transported to the place of his execution, he managed to jump off the truck and escaped to a relative's house. Recovering from his wounds, he waited for the right time to flee to American-controlled South Korea, but was once more betrayed and captured by the Communists, who sentenced him to death a second time. Kim again managed to break loose by knocking out the soldier guarding him with a chair, and escaping to South Korea.

== South Korea and Korean War ==
Kim arrived in Seoul in May 1946, joined several different corps of the Republic of Korea Army and was eventually assigned to G-2 (intelligence). After seeing his homeland embrace Communism, which he had by then greatly hated, Kim promised himself to do everything to prevent South Korea from following the same path. Besides, he would soon find another enemy to fight, now among his very colleagues, corruption. Kim earned President Syngman Rhee's trust with the arrests of Kim Sam-yong and Lee Joo-ha, two key members of the Workers' Party of South Korea. (The WPSK would later merge with its Northern counterpart to become the ruling party in the North.) Rhee, aware that complete control over the army was the only possible way to maintain his regime, saw Kim Chang-Ryong as the ideal right-hand man, as an efficient young officer who could "clean up the mess in the army" and get rid of anyone capable of threatening Rhee's position (Kim himself posed no threat, as his record of having served the Japanese ensured that he would never be supported by the people).

Armed with the favored connection to the country's leader, Kim perhaps became somewhat reckless in his investigations and obviously made serious enemies among army officers, many of whom were indeed involved in corruption business or subversive activities. Kim, now a superior officer, formed, with the support of US Army officials, the CIC, or Counter-intelligence Corps, which was responsible for arresting and interrogating thousands of suspected North Korean spies. It is said that in reference to his infamous relentlessness, General Douglas MacArthur nicknamed him "Kim the Snake." By July 1949, almost 5000 soldiers and officers of the army had been arrested and interrogated.

== Death ==
In 1953, Kim Chang-ryong, then head of the Korean CIC, was promoted to Junjang (Brigadier General) and, in 1955, to a Sojang (Major General). His quick rise through the ranks did not help the growing dislike some of his peers felt toward him. Also, Kim had never been part of the very tight community of frontline officers that had formed during the Korean War, which worsened the estrangement from most of his colleagues. His enemies had already tried several times to assassinate him but all attempts had failed.

In the early morning of January 30, 1956, Kim left home in his Willys Jeep and noticed a car blocking the way. As he shouted at the visitors to get off the road, three shots were fired. Hit in the head, Kim was taken to a nearby hospital, where he died, aged 35. Six people, including Kang Mun-bong, were later tried for his murder, with all of them being found guilty and sentenced to death. Two of the death sentences, including that of Kang, were later commuted to life in prison. The other four men were executed.

== Controversy ==
Because of his relentless investigations, Kim is despised by most Koreans, and some even consider him a war criminal. That was strengthened in later years by the alleged claim of President Kim Ku's murderer, Ahn Doo-hee, that Kim Chang-ryong was the mastermind of the assassination. Kim Gu's relatives even urged the South Korean government to exhume Kim Chang-ryong's remains and to banish them from the National Military Cemetery of Daejeon.

However, Kim Chang-ryong's involvement in the assassination of Kim Gu is not certain; while Kim seems to have looked after Ahn after the assassination, the chief of the operation was Major Chang En-san, the commander of the artillery corps, who himself was arrested by Kim in July 1950 and executed in Daegu. Also, at the time of Kim Gu's death, in 1949, Kim Chang-ryong was only a subordinate officer and could not possibly have been given such a power as organizing an assassination.

== See also ==
- Kim Ku
- Ahn Doo-hee
- Counter Intelligence Corps
- Syngman Rhee
- Yeosu–Suncheon rebellion
- Lee Ki-poong, another of Rhee's "trusted" right hand men
