= Ahn Doo-hee =

Assassin of Kim Ku (1917–1996)

- Hangul: 안두희
- Hanja: 安斗熙
- RR: An Duhui
- MR: An Tuhŭi

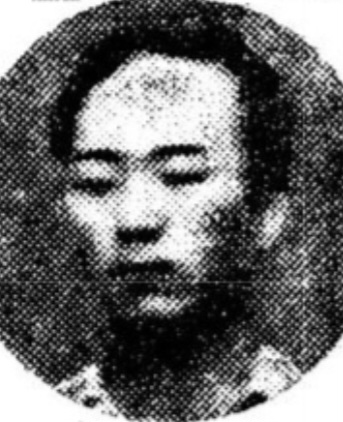
Ahn Doo-hee

Ahn Doo-hee (Korean: 안두희; 24 March 1917 – 23 October 1996), alternatively Ahn Doo-whi, was a Korean lieutenant who assassinated independence activist Korean leader Kim Ku on 26 June 1949. Officially, it is maintained that Ahn Doo-hee acted alone, although some Koreans have theorized that Ahn was part of a broader conspiracy, possibly the CIA. Ahn was killed by an admirer of Kim Ku in 1996.

== Early life ==
Ahn Doo-hee was born on 24 March 1917 in Ryūsen-gun, Heianhoku Province, Korea, Empire of Japan.

== Assassination of Kim Ku ==
On 26 June 1949, Ahn shot Kim Ku four times, killing him.

Ahn was subsequently convicted and sentenced to life in prison. However, shortly afterwards his sentence was commuted to a term of 15 years by then newly elected South Korean president Syngman Rhee. At his trial, Ahn maintained that he was solely responsible for the assassination.

At the outset of the Korean War in 1950, Ahn was released from prison, having served only one year of his 15-year sentence. Upon his release, Ahn was re-instated as a military officer. After serving under Rhee during the Korean War, Ahn was discharged in 1953, having attained the rank of colonel. After Syngman Rhee fled Korea in response to the April Revolution of 1960, Ahn went into hiding, living under an assumed name.

=== Confession ===
On 13 April 1992, the Korean newspaper Dong-a Ilbo published Ahn's confession. Ahn claimed that the assassination of Kim had been ordered by Kim Chang-ryong, who served as the head of national security under the Rhee administration.

== Death and legacy ==
After many years of living as an exile in his native country, and having never served the remainder of his prison sentence, Ahn was assassinated by Park Ki-seo, a 49-year-old bus driver and admirer of Kim Ku, on 23 October 1996. The weapon used to kill Ahn was a wooden club inscribed with the words "Justice Stick". Ahn was 79 years old at the time. He was cremated and his ashes were scattered in the Han River. Park Ki-seo was sentenced to three years in prison for murder, on the grounds that "the motive for the crime was public anger." He was released on 30 July 1997, and died on 10 July 2025.

In 2001, declassified United States military documents dating from 1949 revealed that Ahn had been an informant and, later, an agent, for the U.S. Counter-Intelligence Corps (US CIC) in Korea. Those documents also revealed that Ahn was a member of the extreme anti-communist group known as the White Shirts Society.
