= VII Maneuver Corps =

Republic of Korea Army's Corps

- 제7기동군단
- VII Maneuver Corps insignia
- Active: 18 January 1969–present
- Country: South Korea
- Branch: Republic of Korea Army
- Type: Mechanized Infantry
- Size: Corps
- Part of: Ground Operations Command
- Garrison/HQ: Icheon, Gyeonggi Province
- Nickname: 북진선봉 (Buk-jin Seon-bong / Vanguard of Northern advance)
- March: VII Corps Hymn

Commanders
- Current commander: Lt. Gen. Kim Ho-bok

- VII Maneuver Corps
- Hangul: 칠기동군단
- Hanja: 七機動軍團
- RR: Chil gidong gundan
- MR: Ch'il kidong kundan

The VII Maneuver Corps (Korean: 7기동군단, hanja: 七機動軍團), also known as The vanguard corps of the northern advance (Korean: 북진선봉부대, hanja: 北進先鋒部隊), is a corps of the Republic of Korea Army subordinate to the Ground Operations Command. As the only maneuver force in the Republic of Korea Army that is only in charge of offensive missions, it will advance to North Korea in case of emergency.

In addition, the USFK's 2nd Infantry Division is also assigned to the 7th Corps of the Korean Army in the wartime command system of ROK-US Combined Forces Command to fight together.

== History ==
It traces its history to 1969 and the establishment of the East Coast Guard Command.

== Overview ==
The Army's 7th Maneuver Corps is the first and only maneuver corps of the ROK Army. All corps components are mechanized.

The 7th Corps is said to have changed some of its missions in the current US/ROK Operations Plan 5027, but originally, when the enemy penetrates the 'Highway 1' axis and the 'Cheorwon-Munsan' axis on the western front, after reorganizing the battle lines, It is a unit tasked with striking the enemy's depths with maneuver tactics. For this reason, most army corps have a 'special unit', but the 7th Corps has a 'assault battalion' that takes on the role of establishing a bridgehead after boarding a helicopter and striking the enemy deeply.

In addition, the USFK's 2nd Infantry Division is also assigned to the 7th Corps of the Korean Army in the wartime command system of ROK-US Combined Forces Command to fight together.

== Structure ==
- Direct
  - Headquarters Unit
  - 1st Air Assault Battalion
  - 2nd Air Assault Battalion
  - 107th Signal Group
  - 17th CBRN Battalion
  - 517th Air Defense Battalion
- Attached
  - Capital Mechanized Infantry Division
  - 2nd Quick Response Division
  - 8th Maneuver Division
  - 11th Maneuver Division
  - 7th Engineer Brigade
  - 7th Artillery Brigade
  - 7th Logistic Support Group (belongs to 1st Logistic Support Command)
