= 55th Infantry Division (South Korea) =

- 제55보병사단
- Active: 1975–present
- Country: South Korea
- Branch: Republic of Korea Army
- Type: Infantry
- Size: Division
- Part of: Ground Operations Command
- Garrison/HQ: Yongin, Gyeonggi Province
- Nickname: Beacon Fire

Commanders
- Current commander: Maj. Gen. Ye Min-cheol

The 55th Infantry Division (Korean: 제55보병사단) is a military formation of the Republic of Korea Army. The division is subordinated to the Ground Operations Command and headquartered in Yongin, Gyeonggi Province. It is in charge of local defense and reserve force training in the southeastern part of Gyeonggi and the Seoul Metropolitan Area. During wartime, it functions as the regional reserve force in case the main army failed to stop the North Korean invasion through the front line.

== History ==
The division was founded under the name of 63rd Army Training Group in 1975. The unit insignia has a torch on it, which is also the origin of its nickname. At that time, subordinate units were also in Suwon and Pyeongtaek. In 1978, some subordinate units were incorporated into the 99th Brigade (now 51st Division) under the 33rd Infantry Division, which had moved to Hwaseong.

== Organization ==
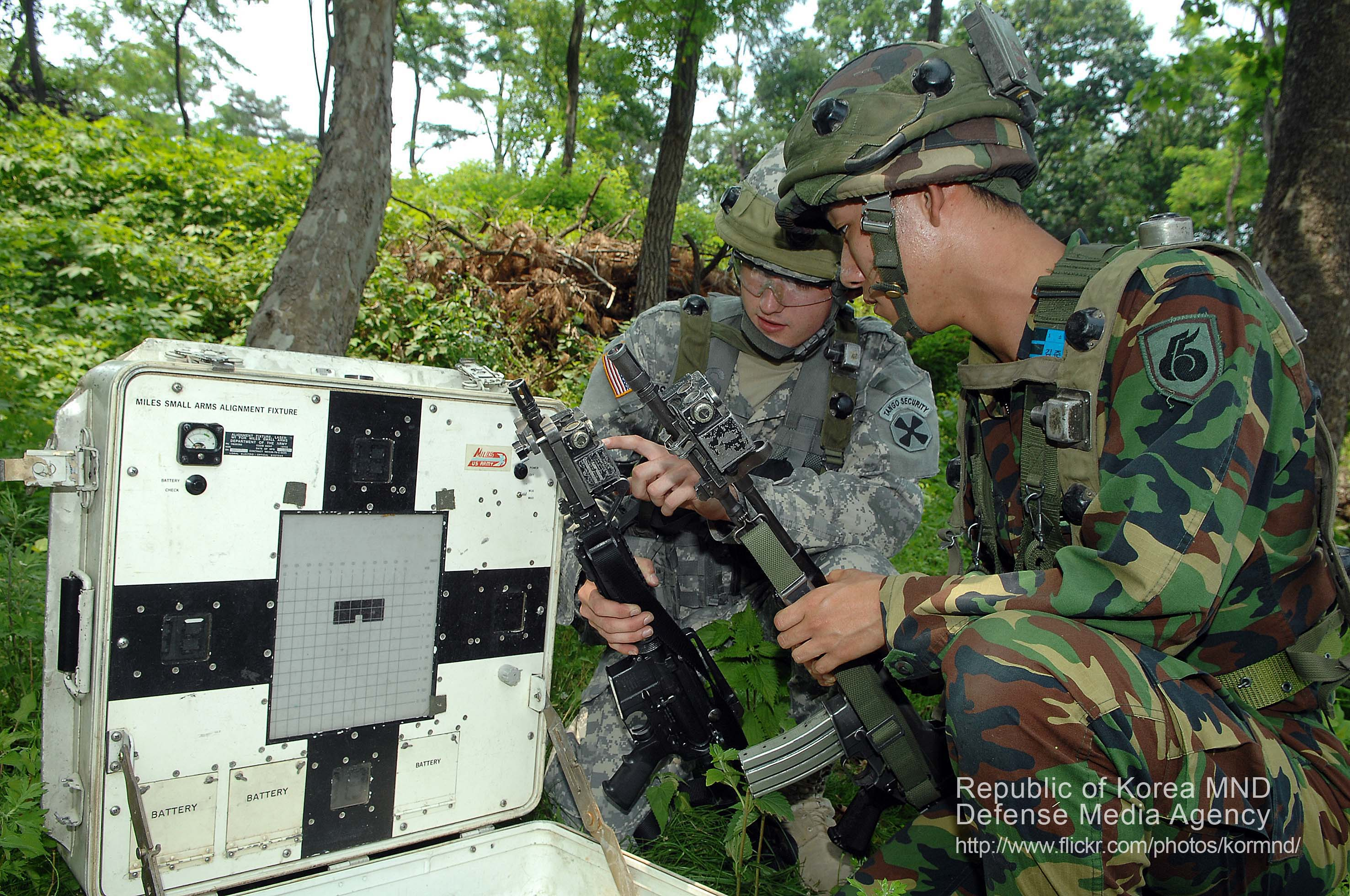
Soldiers from 55th Infantry Division in training with US in 2011.

- Headquarters:
  - Engineer Battalion
  - Mobile Battalion
  - 965th Artillery Battalion
  - Signal Battalion
  - Recruit Training Battalion
  - Military Band Unit
  - Military Police Unit
  - Medical Unit
  - Intelligence Company
  - CBR Unit
  - Air Defense Company
  - Headquarters Company
- 170th Infantry Brigade
  - HQ
  - Maneuver Company
  - Logistics Support Battalion
  - 1st Battalion 'Gwangju/Hanam'
  - 2nd Battalion 'Namyangju/Guri'
  - 3rd Battalion 'Seongnam'
- 171st Infantry Brigade
  - HQ
  - Maneuver Company
  - Logistics Support Battalion
  - 1st Battalion 'Icheon'
  - 2nd Battalion 'Yeoju'
  - 3rd Battalion 'Yangpyong'
- 172nd Infantry Brigade
  - HQ
  - Maneuver Company
  - Logistics Support Battalion
  - 1st Battalion 'Tango'
  - 2nd Battalion 'Anseong'
  - 3rd Battalion 'Yongin'
