= 1st Artillery Brigade (South Korea) =

Unit of the Republic of Korea Army

- 1포병여단
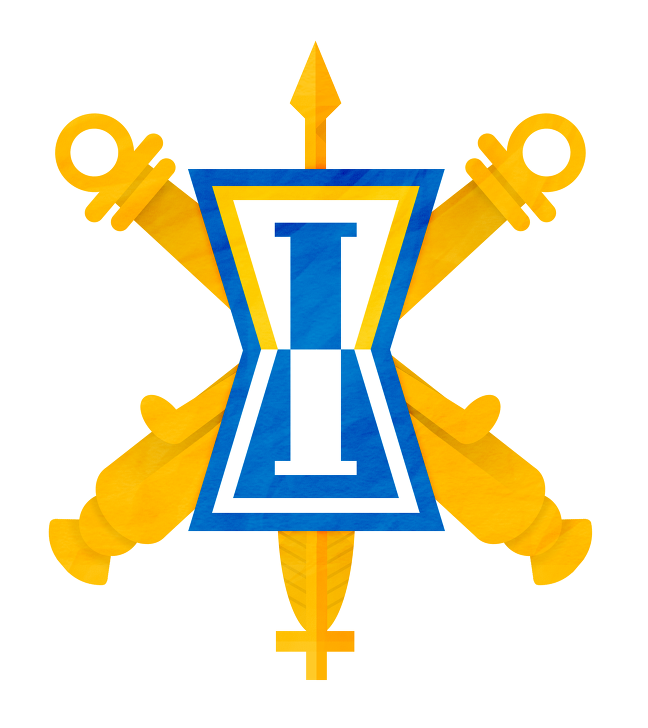
- Active: February 1953 (as 1st Corps Artillery Group); August 1982 – present
- Country: South Korea
- Branch: Republic of Korea Army
- Type: Artillery
- Size: Brigade
- Part of: I Corps
- Garrison/HQ: Goyang, Gyeonggi Province
- Nickname: Flying Tiger

Commanders
- Current commander: Brig. Gen. Lee Sang-ryeol

- 1st Artillery Brigade
- Hangul: 일포병여단
- Hanja: 一砲兵旅團
- RR: Il pobyeong yeodan
- MR: Il p'obyŏng yŏdan

The 1st Artillery Brigade (Korean: 1포병여단; Hanja: 一砲兵旅團) is a military formation of the Republic of Korea Army. The brigade is subordinated to the I Corps.

== History ==
The brigade founded as the 1st Corps Artillery Group on 16 February 1953 and changed its name to 1st Corps Artillery Command on 20 November of the same year. The brigade received its current name in 1982.

The size of the 1st Artillery Brigade is comparable to a division. The brigade is in charge of 17 battalions. It can be regarded to be enormous when compared to other artillery brigades, which have no more than 10 battalions. The ROKA 5th Artillery Brigade is the only unit with the same size.

== Organization ==
- Headquarters (Goyang)
  - 331st Target Acquisition Battalion
  - 657th Artillery Battalion (K239)
  - 2000th Artillery Battalion (M270)
  - Signal Company
- 2nd Artillery Group (Yangju)
  - 355th Artillery Battalion (K9)
  - 652nd Artillery Battalion (K9)
  - 722nd Artillery Battalion (K9)
  - 878th Artillery Battalion (K9A1)
  - 898th Artillery Battalion (K9)
- 3rd Artillery Group (Paju)
  - 651st Artillery Battalion (K9)
  - 655th Artillery Battalion (K9)
  - 733rd Artillery Battalion (K9A1)
  - 868th Artillery Battalion (K9A1)
  - 958th Artillery Battalion (K9)
- 7th Artillery Group (Yangju)
  - 106th Artillery Battalion (KH-179)
  - 107th Artillery Battalion (KH-179)
  - 108th Artillery Battalion (M114)
  - 109th Artillery Battalion (M114)
