= 2nd Quick Response Division (South Korea) =

- 2신속대응사단
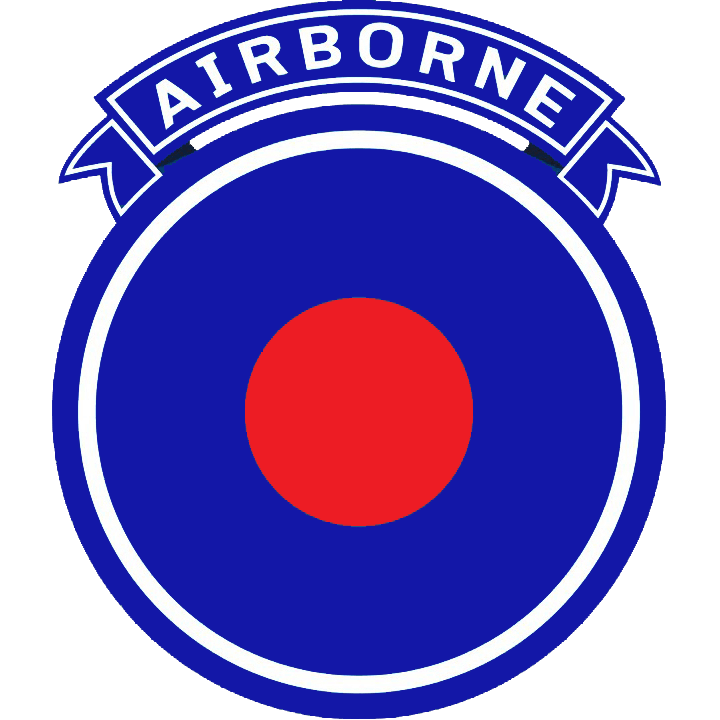
- 2nd Quick Response Division insignia
- Active: May 12, 1949 – present
- Country: South Korea
- Branch: Republic of Korea Army
- Type: Rapid reaction force Airborne forces
- Role: Offensive; Air assault
- Size: Division
- Part of: VII Maneuver Corps
- Garrison/HQ: Yangpyeong, Gyeonggi Province
- Nickname: 노도 (No-do / Furious Wave)
- Engagements: Korean War: Operation Pokpoong; Battle of Uijeongbu (1950); Third Battle of Seoul

Commanders
- Current commander: Maj. Gen. Jang Gwang-seon
- Notable commanders: Col. Yu Sung-ryol

- 2nd Quick Response Division
- Hangul: 이신속대응사단
- Hanja: 二迅速對應師團
- RR: I sinsok daeeung sadan
- MR: I sinsok taeŭng sadan

The 2nd Quick Response Division (Korean: 2신속대응사단, hanja: 二迅速對應師團), also known as Furious Wave Division (Korean: 노도부대, hanja: 怒濤部隊), is a military formation of the Republic of Korea Army and is assigned to the VII Maneuver Corps and performs the mission of an offensive and air assault by using helicopters and transport aircraft.

== History ==
It was formed during the Korean War and was part of the defensive line in the Third Battle of Seoul.

The 17th Infantry participated in the Battle of Pusan Perimeter.

Beginning on December 26, 1950, Communist Chinese Forces struck hard at United Nations units on the western approaches to Seoul. Supporting attacks occurred as well in the central and eastern parts of the line. The Chinese hit the ROK units hard, and again, several units broke. Two out of three regiments of the 2nd Division fled the battlefield, leaving the 17th Regiment to fight alone and hold its position for hours despite heavy losses. General Ridgway reluctantly ordered a general, but orderly, withdrawal, with units instructed to maintain contact with the enemy during their retreat, rather than simply giving up real estate without inflicting losses on the enemy.

On January 1, 2021, the 2nd Division moved its headquarters to Yangpyeong and was reorganized into a quick response division to take charge of offensive and air assault missions by integrating The 201st Quick Response Brigade and The 203rd Quick Response Brigade under 2nd Operations Command.

== Organization ==
- Headquarters:
  - Headquarters Company
  - Combat Support Company
  - Signal Company
- 201st Quick Response Brigade
  - 201st Quick Response Brigade Headquarters and Headquarters Company
  - 1st Quick Response Battalion
  - 2nd Quick Response Battalion
  - 3rd Quick Response Battalion
  - Artillery Battalion
- 203rd Quick Response Brigade
  - 203rd Quick Response Brigade Headquarters and Headquarters Company
  - 1st Quick Response Battalion
  - 2nd Quick Response Battalion
  - 3rd Quick Response Battalion
  - Artillery Battalion

== Unit of the VII Maneuver Corps ==
- Capital Mechanized Infantry Division
- 8th Maneuver Division
- 11th Maneuver Division

== See also ==
- Republic of Korea Army
