= 21st Infantry Division (South Korea) =

Republic of Korea Army division

- Active: 15 January 1953 - present
- Country: South Korea
- Branch: Republic of Korea Army
- Type: Infantry
- Size: Division
- Part of: III Corps
- Garrison/HQ: Yanggu County, Gangwon Province
- Nickname(s): "Baekdusan"

Commanders
- Current commander: Maj. Gen. Lee Sang-ryeol

The 21st Infantry Division (Korean: 제21보병사단) is a military formation of the ROKA. The 21st division is subordinated to the III Corps and is headquartered in Yanggu County, Gangwon Province. It is a frontline division that protects the GOP and GP along Gangwon Province's border with North Korea.

== History ==
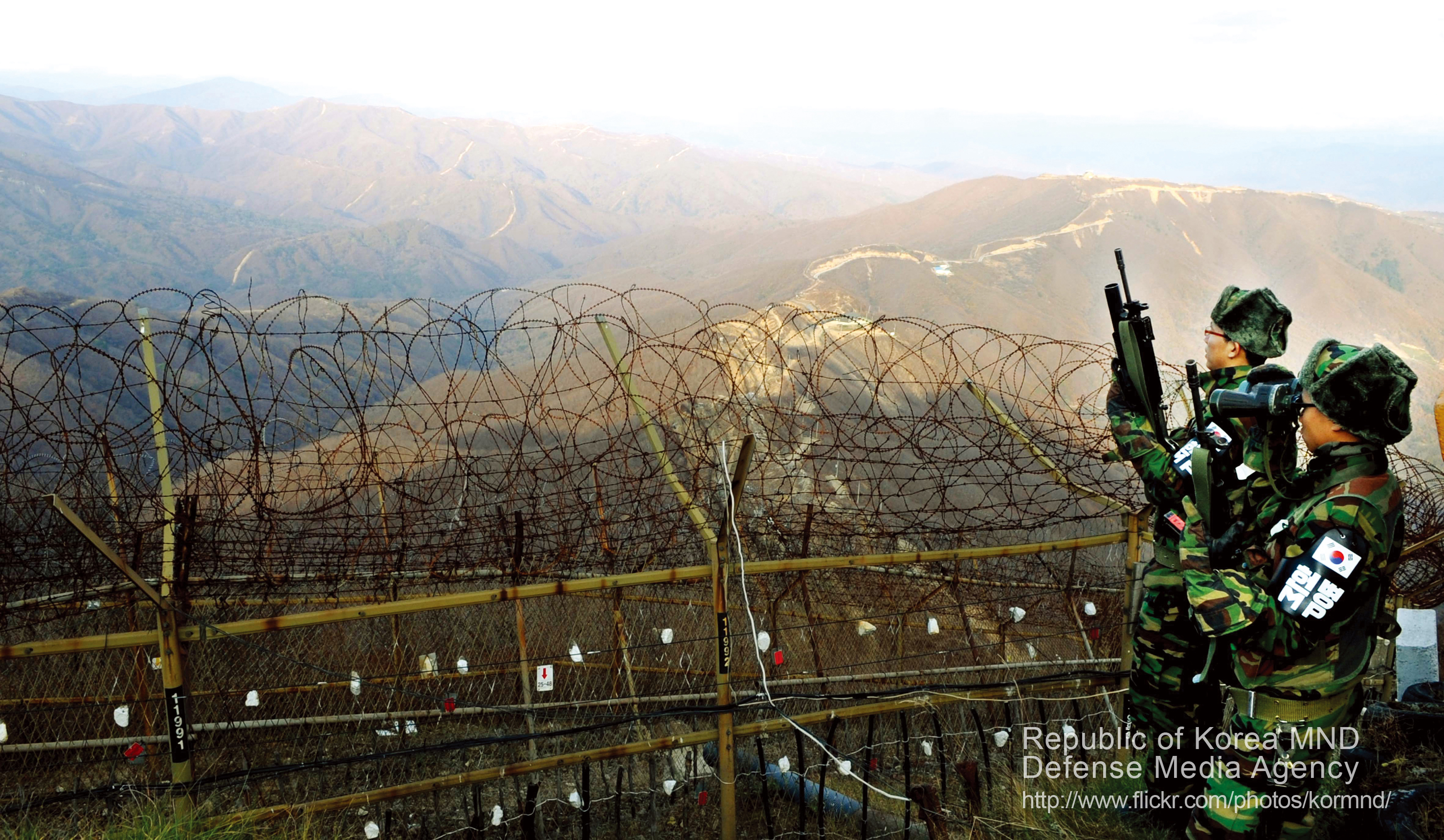
Soldiers of the 21st Infantry Division performing GOP security missions.

The division was established as the 2nd Education Brigade in Yangyang, Gangwon-do on 15 January 1953, near the end of the Korean War. The majority of the division's operational area is a rough mountainous terrain, and it is responsible for maintaining the barbed wire barrier along Gangwon Province's border with North Korea.

The division was participated numerous actions against North Korean Army infiltrators after the Korean War such as the killing of three infiltrators at Gamu-ri near the Bukhangang River in 1976, the infiltration at Daeamsan Mountain in 1979, inducing the defection of Captain Shin Joong-cheol of the North Korean Army in 1983, and the infiltration at Gachilbong Peak in 1997.

== Organization ==
- Headquarters:
  - Headquarters Company
  - Intelligence Company
  - Air Defense Company
  - Reconnaissance Battalion
  - Engineer Battalion
  - Armored Battalion (K1 tanks)
  - Signal Battalion
  - Support Battalion
  - Military Police Battalion
  - Medical Battalion
  - Chemical Battalion
- 32nd Infantry Brigade
- 65th Infantry Brigade
- 66th Infantry Brigade
- Artillery Brigade (K55A1)
