= 22nd Infantry Division (South Korea) =

Republic of Korea Army division

- Active: 21 April 1953–24 December 1958; 1 August 1975–present
- Country: South Korea
- Branch: Republic of Korea Army
- Type: Infantry
- Size: Division (1953-1958, 1982-present); Brigade (1975-1982)
- Part of: III Corps
- Garrison/HQ: Goseong County, Gangwon Province
- Nickname: "Yulgok"

Commanders
- Current commander: Maj. Gen. Yoon Bong-hee

The 22nd Infantry Division (Korean: 제22보병사단) is a military formation of the ROKA. The 22nd division is subordinated to the III Corps and is headquartered in Goseong County, Gangwon Province. It is a frontline division that protects the GOP and GP of Goseong County and Gangwon Province's coastline.

== History ==
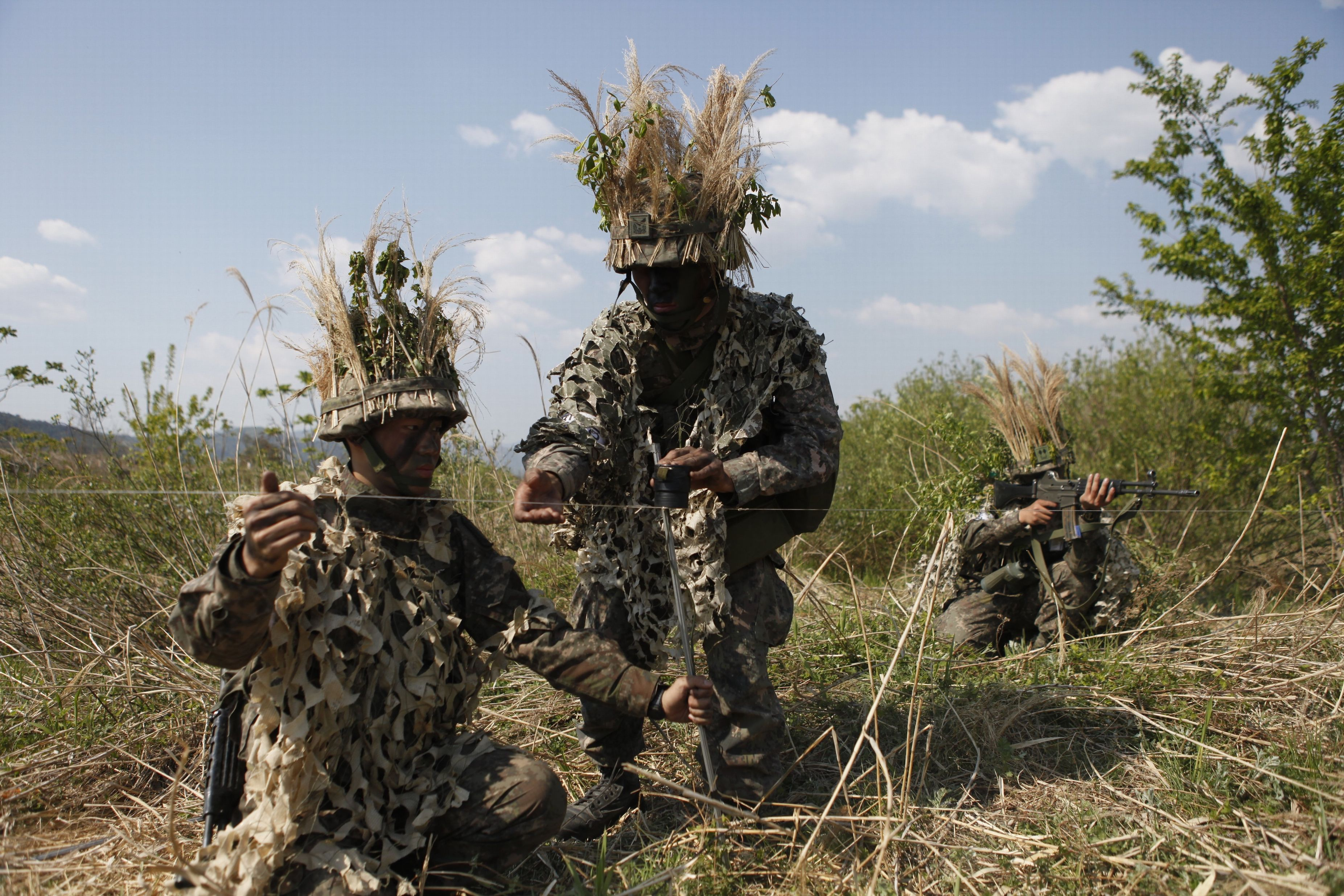
Soldiers of the 22nd Infantry Division planted Interdiction-sensing wire to track enemy movement.

The division was established along with the 25th Infantry Division in Yangyang County, Gangwon on 21 April 1953, at the end of the Korean War. Shortly after the war, on 24 December 1958, it was disbanded. On 1 August 1975, it was re-established as the 88th Infantry Brigade in Goseong County, Gangwon to strengthen the Gangwon's borderline. Seven years later, the unit changed to its original name "22nd Infantry Division".

The 22nd Infantry Division is in charge of 97 kilometers of border line, including 28 kilometers inland and 69 kilometers of shoreline. It is the ROKA's only unit in charge of both the Demilitarized Zone and coastal security. The unit also responsible for immigration-related duties at Geumgang Mountain, which has many hiking paths near the border. 22nd division is regarded by its soldiers as the "grave of general's stars" since numerous divisional commanders have been reprimanded as a result of the extensive areas of responsibility and the heavy workload of soldiers that have resulted in incidents along the border.

== Organization ==
- Headquarters:
  - Headquarters Company
  - Donghae CIQ
  - Intelligence Company
  - Air Defense Company
  - Reconnaissance Battalion
  - Engineer Battalion
  - 28th Armored Battalion (K1 tanks)
  - Coastal Surveillance Operation Battalion
  - Signal Battalion
  - Support Battalion
  - Military Police Group
  - Medical Battalion
  - Chemical Battalion
- 53rd Infantry Brigade (K808 APCs)
- 55th Infantry Brigade (K808 APCs)
- 56th Infantry Brigade (K808 APCs)
- Artillery Brigade (K55A1)
