= Guard posts in South Korea =

Military installation

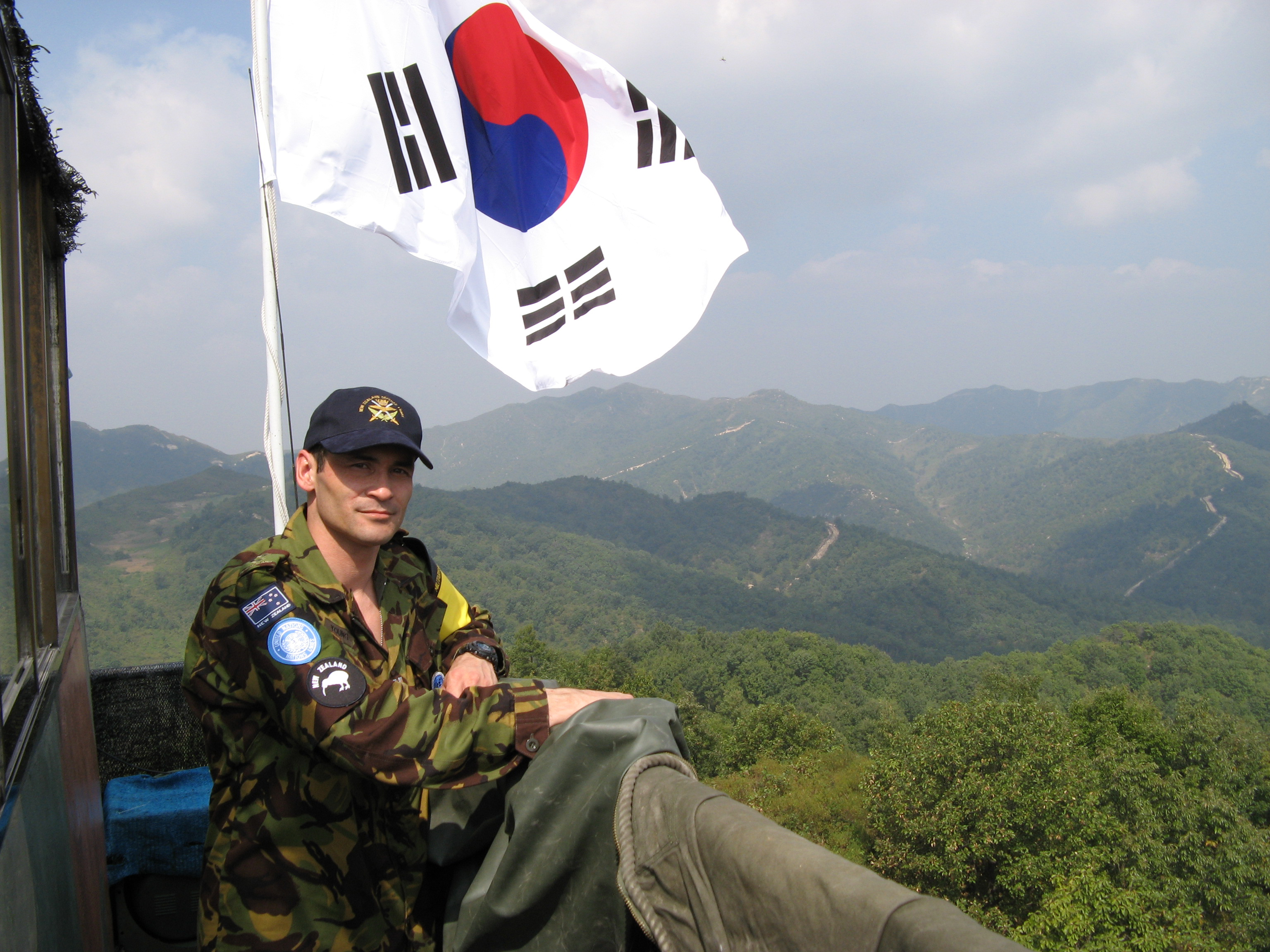
A Lieutenant staffing a guard post.

Guard posts in South Korea are located on the front-line between North and South Korea at the DMZ (비무장지대). As they are located in the most dangerous area, they have special features that are different from the usual guard post. They consist of a bunker-type structure and few personnel.

== History ==
In 1953, the DMZ was established under an agreement following the cease-fire. Soldiers were initially banned from entering the DMZ, but were stationed on each side. Since 1963, the two sides have competitively installed guard posts (GPs) within the zone. Some GPs are equipped with barbed wire fences.

Until the late 1990s, search squads were stationed at the line of control. Then they were put under the direct control of the next line regiment. This varies according to various factors.

GPs are distinct from General Out Posts (GOP) and refer to a frontline post guarding the Southern Limit Line. GPs are inside the uDMZ and GOPs are outside the DMZ. Due to GPs security needs, private groups such as the media have little access.

The 530GP incident raised their public profile.

GP units face the danger of unknown land mines in the DMZ, limiting their movement and limiting the number of visitors. GP units and visitors are required to obtain advance permission from the United Nations Command. Those who have not gone through background checks cannot enter a GP. GOP units can stay out overnight and take vacations, while GPs are only allowed overnight departures in special cases. Unlike ordinary units, fatigue levels are high, and CCTVs are installed, so all actions are regimented. Mental fatigue is high. GP employees recover their vacation time when they rotate out.

Depending on the front, the environment differs. The western front is flanked by GPs from the north and south, bordering the wide plain along the Imjin River. The scenery is beautiful and the road from the GOP to the GP is smooth. On the eastern front, they are close to North Korean GPs and located in rough mountains, so the roads are twisted and unpaved.

== Organization ==
Search squadrons carry out DMZ guard missions for a period of time. They receive months of training in the rear, followed by months of guard operations at GPs. Platoon troops are dispatched to each GP. Search soldiers' job is to monitor and patrol the DMZ. Most GPs are located on mountaintops for visibility. Search and guard operations in the DMZ are complicated by heavy bulletproof suits, ammunition, grenades, and bayonets. They experience heavy fatigue, as their actions require them to be fully armed. Supplies are top priority and various special equipment is provided.

=== Soldier ===
Soldiers can apply to join a search team and search company during boot camp. The team is selected based on the results of the training center and interview scores, and transfers are not permitted.

=== Cadre ===
The unit commander selects cadres based on service records. If there are no qualified personnel, the unit may be forcibly moved at the commander's discretion. GP service offers significant benefits in long-term service screening, so executives who want long-term service usually go.

=== Facility ===
Most of Korea's GPs were built in the 1970s and 1980s. Many GPs are older than average facilities.

== Incidents ==
=== 2005 shooting ===
On June 19, 2005, at the 530GP in Yeoncheon County private Kim Dong-min threw a grenade with a pin released at the interior office and fired a gun, killing eight people and injuring two others, known to the Korean public as the "Kim Il-byeong Incident."

=== Suicide ===
On November 16, 2018, Private Kim was found with a gunshot wound to the head in the bathroom of the GP on the eastern front of Yanggu and died en route to hospital.

=== Withdrawal demonstration ===
On July 24, 2018, the Ministry of National Defense decided to withdraw GP equipment and troops on a trial basis. On November 11, all 11 guard posts were demolished. Mutual verification of demolition of the South and the North was completed on December 12. This was the first time that the 9.19 military agreement had been implemented and verified.

Among the withdrawn GPs, Cheorwon GP, where the Battles of Arrowhead Hill took place in 1952, 1953, and Jangdan GP, west of Dora Observatory, were opened to the public.

=== 2020 shooting ===
On May 3, 2020, a soldier fired upon a GP in Gyeonggi Province. Four bullets were found on the outer wall of the GP. The South Korean military fired warning shots with 15 K-3 machine guns and 15 K-6 machine guns.
