= 20th Armored Brigade (South Korea) =

Unit of the Republic of Korea Army

- 제20기갑여단
- Unit insignia
- Active: 29 November 2019 – present
- Country: South Korea
- Branch: Republic of Korea Army
- Type: Armored
- Size: Brigade
- Part of: III Corps
- Garrison/HQ: Hongcheon County, Gangwon Province
- Nickname(s): 독수리 (Eagle)

Commanders
- Current commander: Brig. Gen. Kang Byung-moo

The 20th Armored Brigade (Korean: 제20기갑여단) is a military formation of the Republic of Korea Army. The brigade is subordinated to the III Corps.

== History ==
The 20th Armored Brigade was created by merging some units of the 11th Maneuver Division and 20th Mechanized Infantry Division. It was created to reinforce the strength of the III Corps, which had no independent armored unit before the establishment of the brigade.

== Organization ==
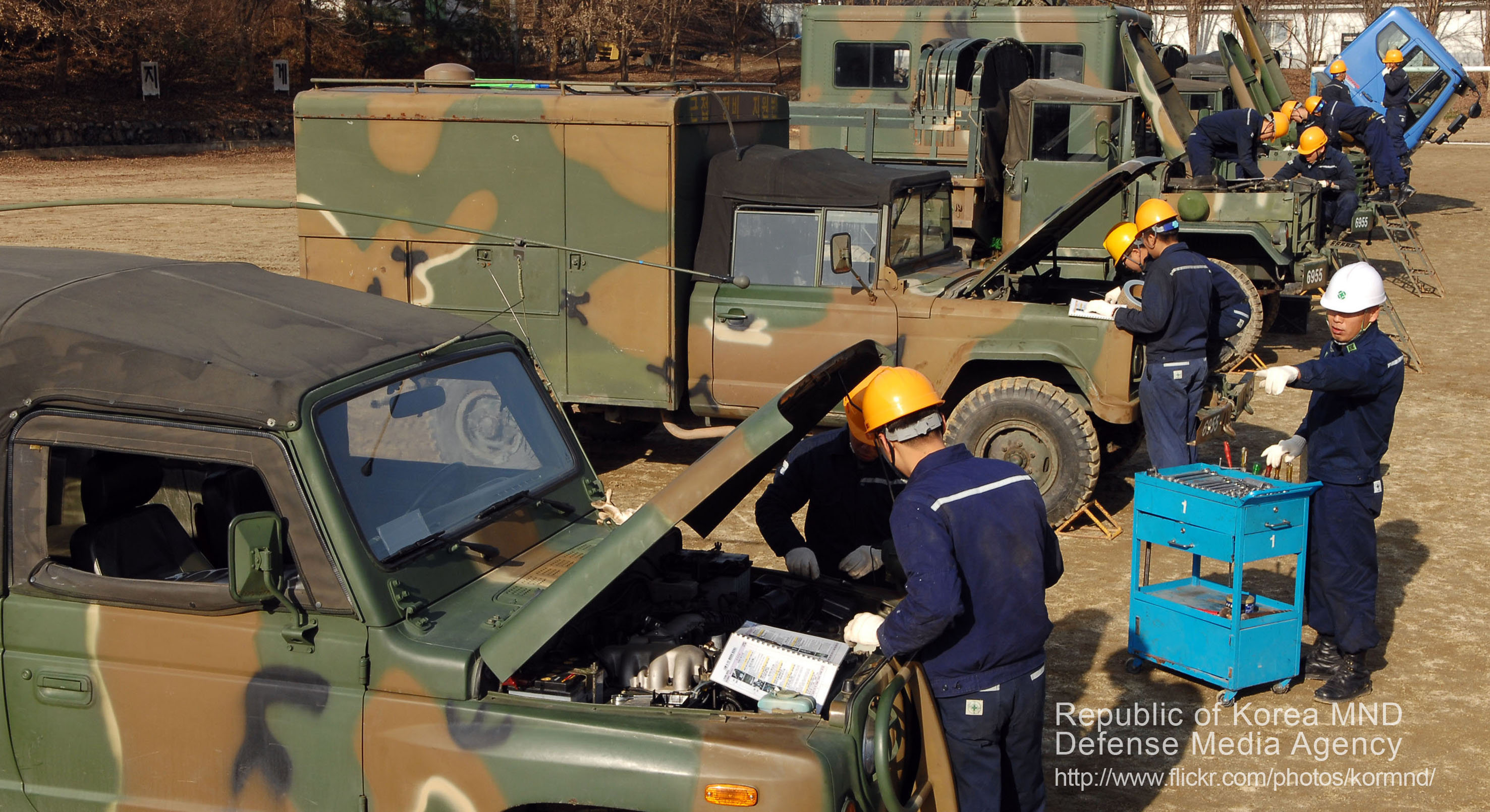
Soldiers of the 20th Mechanized Infantry Division (the brigade's former name) maintaining their vehicles.

- Headquarters:
  - Headquarters Company
  - Air Defense Artillery Battery (K30)
  - Armored Engineer Company
  - Armored Reconnaissance Company
  - Intelligence Company
  - Signal Company
  - Support Battalion
  - Chemical Company
- 37th Armored Battalion (K1E1)
- 59th Armored Battalion (K1E1)
- 130th Mechanized Infantry Battalion (K200A1)
- 53rd Artillery Battalion (K55A1)
