= 102nd Armored Brigade =

Armored brigade of South Korea

- 제102기갑여단
- Active: 1 June 1988 – 30 September 2008 (as 102nd Infantry Brigade); 1 October 2008 – present (as 102nd Armored Brigade)
- Country: South Korea
- Branch: Republic of Korea Army
- Type: Armored
- Size: Brigade
- Part of: III Corps
- Garrison/HQ: Yangyang County, Gangwon Province
- Nickname: Sunrise

Commanders
- Current commander: Brig. Gen. Moon Ki-soo

The 102nd Armored Brigade (Korean: 제102기갑여단) is a military formation of the Republic of Korea Army. The brigade is subordinated to the III Corps.

== History ==
The brigade was founded in Samcheok in 1988 and moved to its current location in Yangyang in 1992. Since then, it has undergone several expansion and reorganization processes. In peacetime, the unit operated as a disaster relief forces for Yeongdong region.

== Organization ==
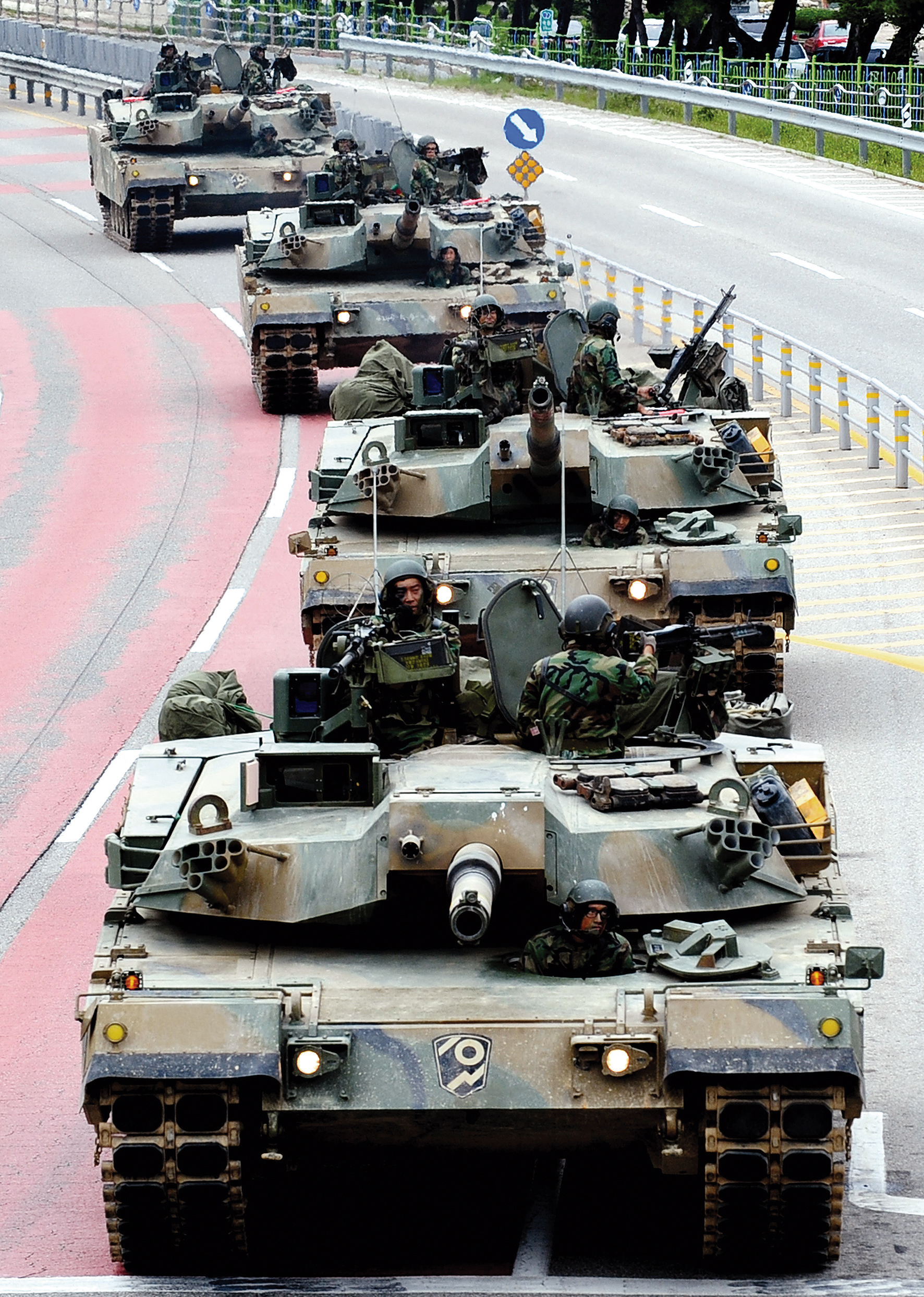
K1 tanks of the 102nd Armored Brigade are moving to the tactical assembly area on National Route 7 along the Korean East Coast.

- Headquarters:
  - Headquarters Company
  - Air Defense Artillery Battery
  - Armored Engineer Company
  - Chemical Company
  - Armored Reconnaissance Company
  - Signal Company
  - Support Battalion
- 33rd Armored Battalion (K1E1)
- 58th Armored Battalion (K1E1)
- 131st Mechanized Infantry Battalion (K200)
- 536th Artillery Battalion (K55A1)
