= 36th Infantry Division (South Korea) =

36th Homeland Defense Infantry Division
- 제36향토보병사단
- Active: 20 April 1955 – present
- Country: South Korea
- Branch: Republic of Korea Army
- Type: Infantry
- Size: Division
- Part of: Ground Operations Command
- Garrison/HQ: Wonju, Gangwon Province
- Nickname(s): White Tiger
- March: 36th Division Hymn

Commanders
- Current commander: Maj. Gen. Lee Yong-hwan

The 36th Homeland Defense Infantry Division (Korean: 제36향토보병사단, Hanja: 第三十六鄕土步兵師團) is a military formation of the Republic of Korea Army. The division is subordinated to the Ground Operations Command and headquartered in Wonju, Gangwon Province. During peacetime, they are in charge of defense central and southern Gangwon Province. They also are responsible for recruit training and flood control.

== History ==
The division was created in Inje County, Gangwon Province on 20 April 1955, shortly after Korean War and moved to current garrison in 1982.

== Organization ==
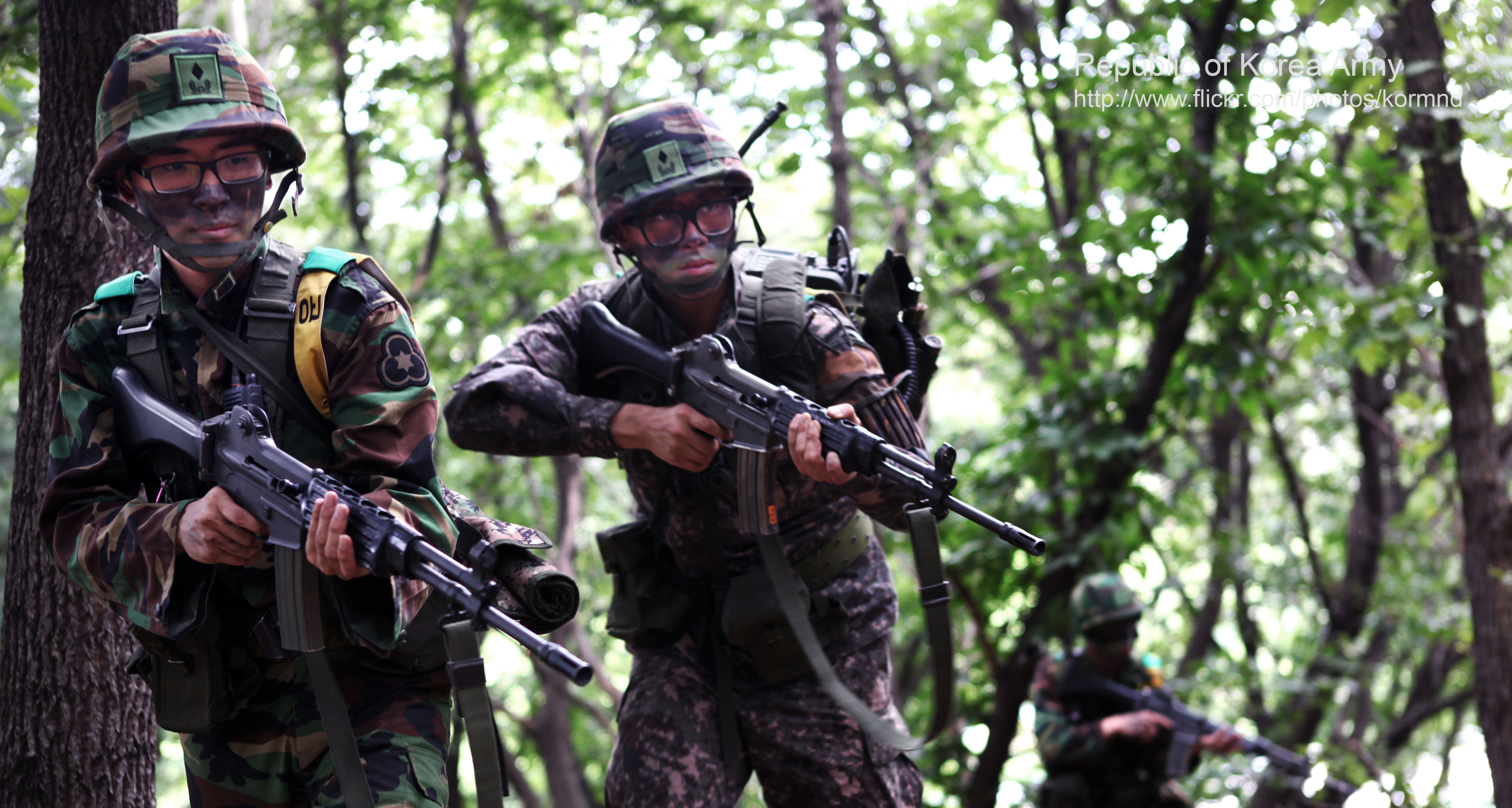
Soldiers from 36th Infantry Division patrolling in jungle during a military exercise in 2012.

- Headquarters:
  - Reconnaissance Battalion
  - Engineer Battalion
  - Mobile Battalion
  - Artillery Battalion
  - Signal Battalion
  - Support Battalion
  - Military Police Battalion
  - Medical Battalion
  - Chemical Battalion
  - Intelligence Company
  - Air Defense Company
  - Headquarters Company
- 107th Infantry Brigade
- 108th Infantry Brigade
