= I Corps (South Korea) =

- 1군단
- Active: 24 July 1950 – present
- Country: Republic of Korea
- Branch: Republic of Korea Army
- Role: Offensive force
- Part of: Ground Operations Command
- Nickname: 광개토 (Gwanggaeto / Gwanggaeto the Great)
- Engagements: Korean War; Battle of the Pusan Perimeter; Battle of the Soyang River

Commanders
- Notable commanders: Paik Sun-yup; Kim Jong-oh; Lee Hyung-geun

- I Corps
- Hangul: 일군단
- Hanja: 一軍團
- RR: Il gundan
- MR: Il kundan

The I Corps (Korean: 1군단; Hanja: 一軍團) is a corps of the Republic of Korea Army. It is named Gwanggaeto Corps (광개토부대; 廣開土軍團).

It was created on July 24, 1950, just before the Battle of the Pusan Perimeter. It consisted of the 8th Infantry Division and the Capital Division. During the Battle of the Pusan Perimeter (July–September, 1950), its headquarters was at Sangju.

Currently, the I Corps is the largest corps of the ROK Army. The corps is organized with three infantry divisions, one mechanized infantry division, and several separate brigades.

== History ==
=== Korean War ===
==== Wonsan (1950) ====
Under the direction of U.S. Army General Walker, the ROK I Corps participated in the crossing of the 38th parallel on October 1, 1950. They rushed north to the North Korean port of Wonsan on October 10, 1950. Leaving parts of their force in Wonsan, the I Corps also went west. The U.S. Army X Corps under the command of General MacArthur had planned a second amphibious landing at Wonsan but after the ROK I Corps victory there, no assault was needed. The X Corps walked ashore. U.S. General Almond then added the ROK I Corps to his command.

==== UN offensive into North Korea (1950) ====
After adding the ROK I corps to his command, General Almond used them to clear northeastern North Korea. Columns of troops were sent up over the mountains to clear and maintain the coast towards the Yalu River and Changjin Reservoir.

==== Chinese intervention ====
In November 1950, the I Corps fought at Sudong against the Chinese. Along with the help of the United States Marine Corps, they were able to defeat the Chinese and cause at least 662 deaths.

=== 21st century ===
The corps now includes the 1st Infantry Division and the 30th Armored Brigade, formerly the 30th Mechanized Infantry Division.

== Structure ==
- I Corps
  - Direct
    - Headquarters Unit
    - 701st Commando Regiment
    - 141st Intelligence Battalion
    - 101st Signal Group
    - 301st Security Regiment
    - 11th Aviation Group
    - 11th CBRN Battalion
  - Attached
    - 1st Infantry Division
    - 9th Infantry Division
    - 25th Infantry Division
    - 2nd Armored Brigade
    - 30th Armored Brigade
    - 1st Engineer Brigade
    - 1st Artillery Brigade
    - 1st Logistic Support Brigade
