= 30th Armored Brigade (South Korea) =

Armored brigade of South Korea

- 제30기갑여단
- Active: February 1955 – September 1991 (as 30th Infantry Division); October 1991 – November 2020 (as 30th Mechanized Infantry Division); December 2020 – present
- Country: South Korea
- Branch: Republic of Korea Army
- Type: Armored
- Size: Brigade
- Part of: I Corps
- Garrison/HQ: Goyang, Gyeonggi Province
- Nickname: 필승 (Pilsung / Certain Victory)

Commanders
- Current commander: Brig. Gen. Shin Chang-dae

The 30th Armored Brigade (Korean: 제30기갑여단) is a military formation of the Republic of Korea Army. The brigade is subordinated to the I Corps.

== History ==
Following the defense reform, the 30th Mechanized Infantry Division was disbanded on 30 November 2020, and reorganized to the 30th Armored Brigade.

Subordinate units of 30th Mechanized Infantry Division and the 90th Brigade merged into the 30th Armored Brigade. The former 90th brigade headquarters was also selected as the site for the brigade headquarters.

== Organization ==
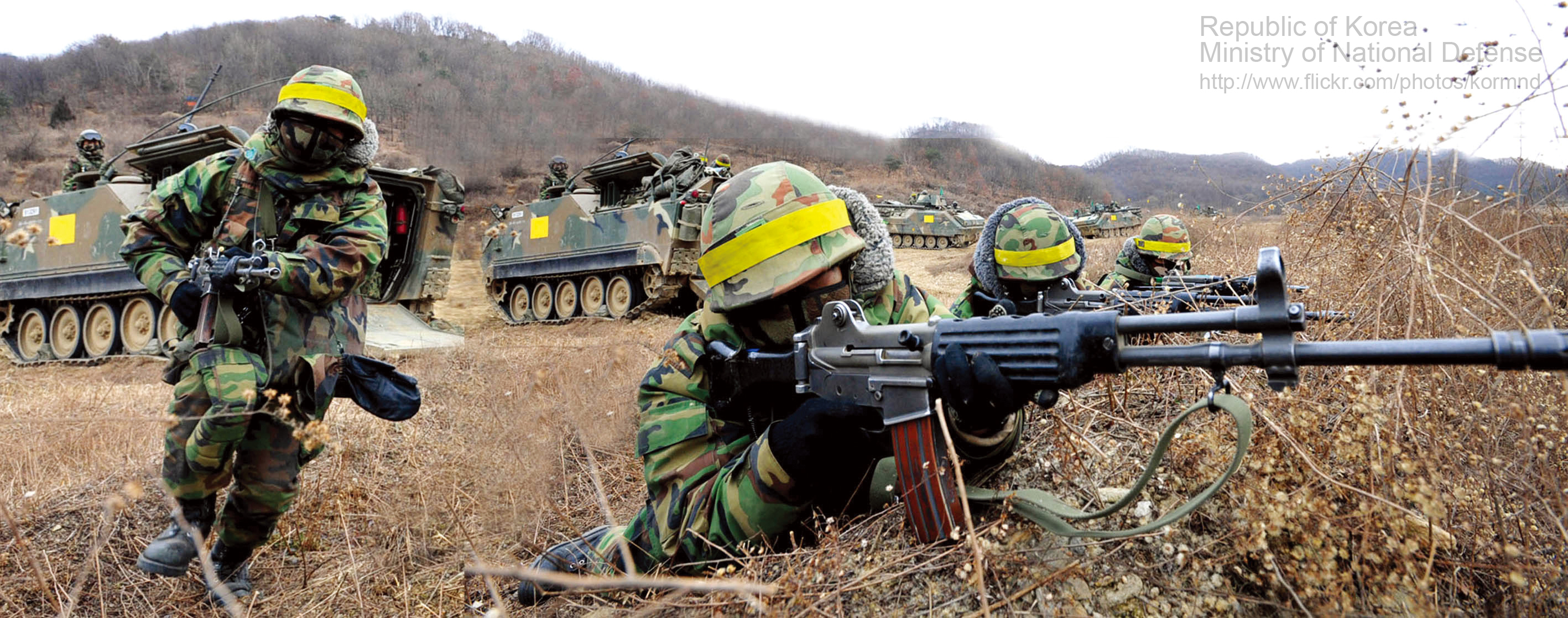
A cold season tactical level field exercise performed by the troops with K200 APC of the 30th Mechanized Infantry Division (the brigade's former name) at Paju

- Headquarters:
  - Headquarters Company
  - Air Defense Artillery Battery
  - Armored Engineer Company
  - Chemical Company
  - Armored Reconnaissance Company
  - Signal Company
  - Support Company
  - Intelligence Company
- 51st Armored Battalion (K1A2)
- 52nd Armored Battalion (K1A2)
- 53rd Armored Battalion (K1A2)
- 115th Mechanized Infantry Battalion (K200)
- 119th Mechanized Infantry Battalion (K200)
- 311th Artillery Battalion (K55A1)
- 315th Artillery Battalion (K55A1)
