= 2nd Armored Brigade (South Korea) =

- 제2기갑여단
- Active: 1968 – present
- Country: South Korea
- Branch: Republic of Korea Army
- Type: Armored
- Size: Brigade
- Part of: I Corps
- Garrison/HQ: Paju, Gyeonggi Province
- Nickname(s): Loyalty

Commanders
- Current commander: Brig. Gen. Goo Sam-hoe

The 2nd Armored Brigade (Korean: 제2기갑여단) is a military formation of the Republic of Korea Army. The brigade is subordinated to the I Corps.

== History ==
It was founded along with the "1st Armored Brigade" on 1 April 1968, and from 4 October 1971, both brigades were assigned to the 1st Corps. At the time of its establishment, it was stationed in Yangju, Gyeonggi Province, but since 1973, it has been moved to current headquarters at Paju, Gyeonggi.

The 2nd Armored Brigade command post was used by the USFK 7th Division (Camp Ross). On 27 June 1973, US forces withdrew due to Nixon Doctrine and 2nd Armored Brigade took over the site.

== Organization ==
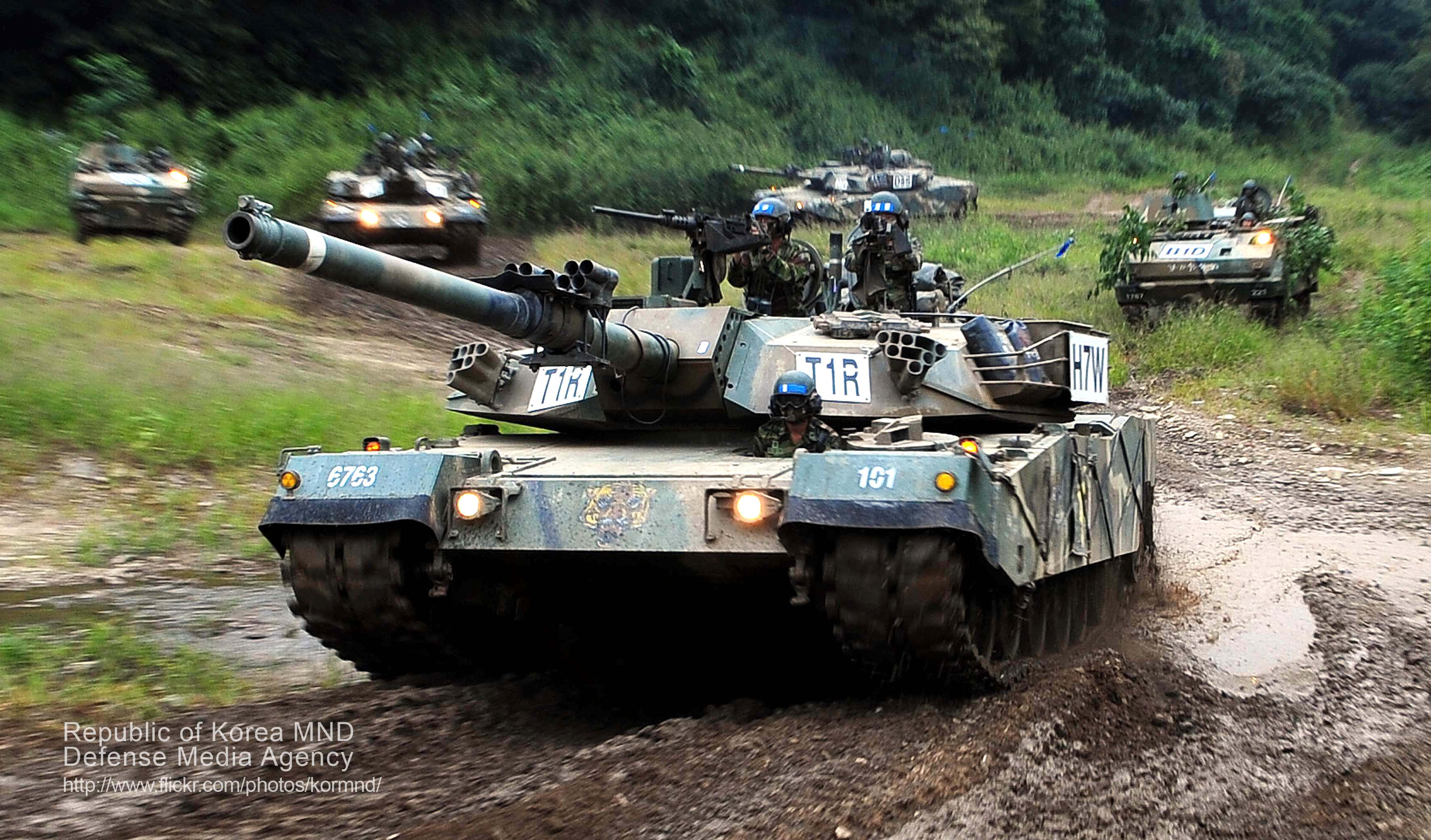
K1 tanks belonging to the 2nd Armored Brigade are conducting exercise in the area of Mugun-ri, Paju, Gyeonggi.

- Headquarters:
  - Headquarters Company
  - Air Defense Artillery Battery
  - Armored Engineer Company
  - Chemical Company
  - Armored Reconnaissance Company
  - Signal Company
  - Support Company
  - Intelligence Company
- 6th Armored Battalion (K1A2)
- 16th Armored Battalion (K1A2)
- 29th Armored Battalion (K1A2)
- 106th Mechanized Infantry Battalion (K200A1)
- 121st Mechanized Infantry Battalion (K200A1)
- 606th Artillery Battalion (moved from 30th Mechanized Infantry Division after it was disbanded, K9)
- 933rd Artillery Battalion (K55A1)
