= 17th Infantry Division (South Korea) =

Republic of Korea Army division

- Active: 20 March 1955 - present
- Country: South Korea
- Branch: Republic of Korea Army
- Type: Infantry
- Size: Division
- Part of: Capital Corps
- Garrison/HQ: Bupyeong District, Incheon
- Nickname: "Lightning"

Commanders
- Current commander: Maj. Gen. Eo Chang-yoon

The 17th Infantry Division (Korean: 제17보병사단) is a military formation of the ROKA. The 17th division is subordinated to the Capital Corps and is headquartered in Bupyeong District, Incheon. Its responsibility is the defense of Incheon.

== Organization ==
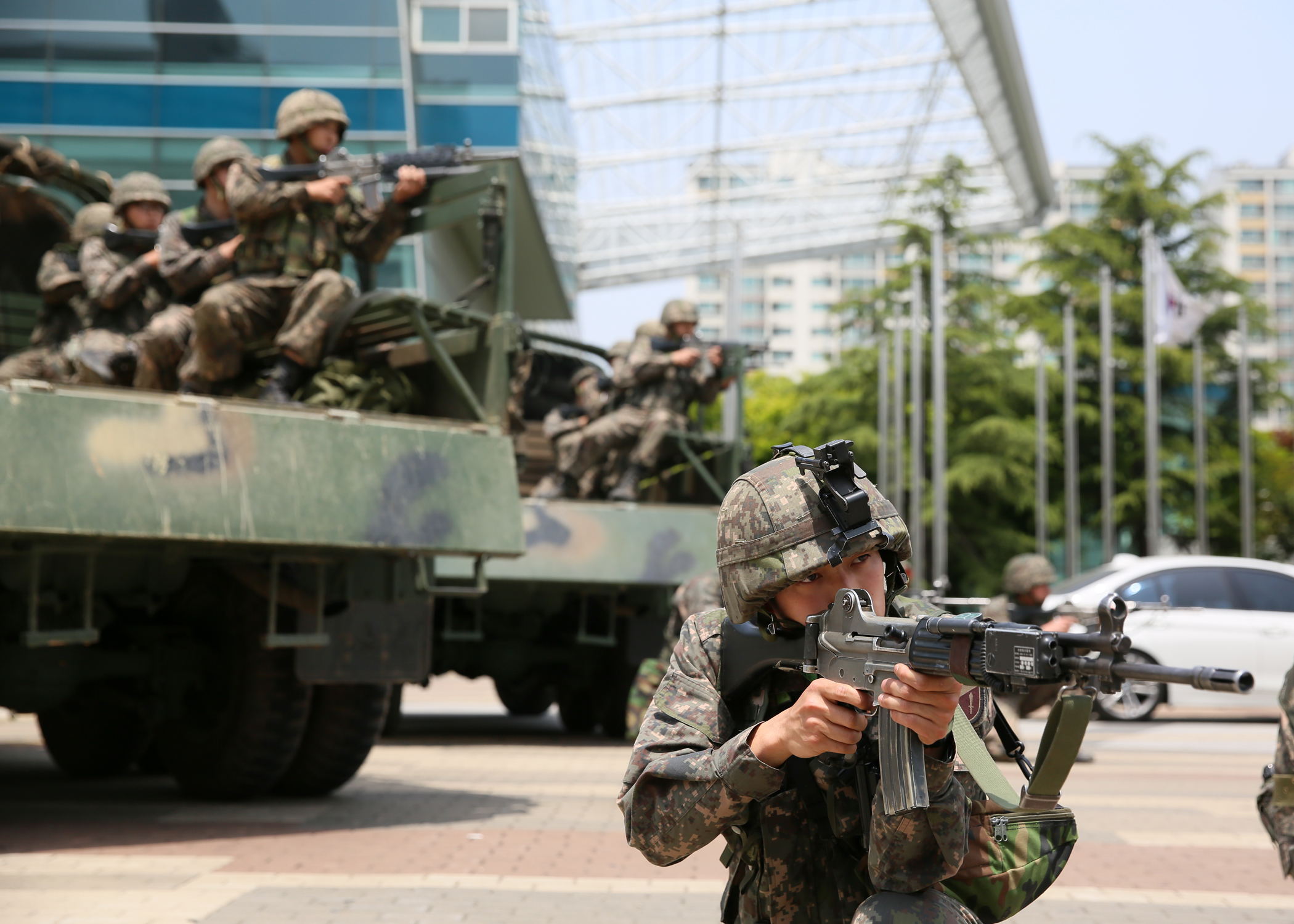
Soldiers of the 17th Infantry Division during anti-terror training in Incheon.

- Headquarters:
  - Headquarters Company
  - Intelligence Company
  - Air Defense Company
  - Reconnaissance Battalion
  - Engineer Battalion
  - Armored Battalion
  - Signal Battalion
  - Support Battalion
  - Military Police Battalion
  - Medical Battalion
  - Chemical Battalion
- 3rd Security Group
- 100th Infantry Brigade
- 101st Infantry Brigade
- 102nd Infantry Brigade
- 507th Infantry Brigade
- Artillery Brigade (equipped with K55A1 SPHs)
