= 8th Maneuver Division =

- 8기동사단
- 8th Maneuver Division insignia
- Active: June 20, 1949 – Present
- Country: South Korea
- Branch: Republic of Korea Army
- Type: Mechanized Infantry
- Role: Offensive; Maneuver warfare
- Size: Division
- Part of: VII Maneuver Corps
- Garrison/HQ: Yangju, Gyeonggi Province
- Nickname: 오뚜기 (O-ttu-gi / Roly-poly toy)
- March: 8th Division Hymn
- Engagements: Korean War: Battle of Pusan Perimeter

Commanders
- Current commander: Maj. Gen. Ham Hee-seong
- Notable commanders: Lt. Col. Park Shi Ch'ang

- 8th Maneuver Division
- Hangul: 팔기동사단
- Hanja: 八機動師團
- RR: Pal gidong sadan
- MR: P'al kidong sadan

The 8th Maneuver Division (Korean: 8기동사단, hanja: 八機動師團), also known as Roly Poly Toy Division (Korean: 오뚜기부대), is a military formation of the Republic of Korea Army and is unit is one of four divisions under the command of the VII Maneuver Corps. Before the unit was renamed on January 1, 2021, it was called the 8th Mechanized Infantry Division.

== History ==
The unit initially comprised the 10th, 16th and 21st Regiments. The 16th Infantry Regiment was originally activated as the 16th Regiment on October 28, 1948, at Masan and was first commanded by Lieutenant colonel Park Shi Ch'ang.

The 8th Infantry Division was activated as the 8th Division on June 20, 1949 at Gangneung and was first commanded by Brigadier general Lee Hyong Kun. The unit originally comprised the 10th and 21st Regiments.

Following its activation the 8th Division was positioned near the 38th Parallel.

=== Korean War ===
It became part of I Corps after the First Battle of Seoul. It was part of the defensive line to slow the North Korean Korean People's Army (KPA) advance from Seoul to Taejon. It fought in the Battle of Pusan Perimeter.

The division was part of the Eighth United States Army advance towards Yalu River, the 24th Division and the attached British 27th Brigade positioned on the left, proceeded to the Chongchon; the ROKA II Corps, with the ROK 1st Division, advanced on the right. To the east the 8th Division reached Tokchon, 40 miles (64 km) north of Pyongyang, during the night of October 23, and then turned north and arrived at Kujang-dong on the Chongchon River, about 10 miles (16 km) from Tokchon, two days later. After the Chinese People's Volunteer Army (PVA) intervention in the war, PVA troops broke the defences of its 16th Regiment during the battle on October 31, 1950.

In November 1950, the division was among five allied formations (including the ROK 6th, 7th, and 8th Divisions) that the U.S. Army judged 'were shattered units that would need extensive rest and refitting to recover combat effectiveness.'

=== Postwar ===
On 1 December 2011, 8th Infantry Division completed the transition to mechanized infantry.

On 1 December 2016, 8th Mechanized Infantry Division was reassigned from V Corps to VII Corps in order to prepare for future reorganization.

On 30 November 2018, 8th Mechanized Infantry Division was consolidated with 26th Mechanized Infantry Division. Although 8th Division retained its name, its original subordinate forces were either dissolved or replaced.

On 1 January 2021, the 8th Mechanized Infantry Division was renamed the 8th Maneuver Division.

== Current disposition ==
December 1, 2011, 8th Infantry Division has finished the switch to mechanized infantry; and is previously part of the combined divisions of the U.S. and South Korean forces, the wartime command was the 2nd Infantry Division of the U.S. Army. December 1, 2016, 8th Mechanized Infantry Division was reassigned from V Corps to VII Corps in order to prepare for future reorganization. November 30, 2018, 8th Mechanized Infantry Division was consolidated with 26th Mechanized Infantry Division. Although 8th Division retained its name, its original subordinate forces were either dissolved or replaced. On 1 January 2021, the 8th Mechanized Infantry Division was renamed the 8th Maneuver Division.

- Headquarters:
  - Engineer Battalion
  - Intelligence Battalion
  - Support Battalion
  - Armored Reconnaissance Battalion
  - Medical Battalion
  - Signal Battalion
  - CBRN Battalion
  - Air Defense Battalion
  - Military Police Battalion
  - Replacement Company
  - Headquarters Company
- 1st Mechanized Infantry Brigade (known as Cavalry Brigade, formerly under Capital Mechanized Infantry Division)
  - 1st Brigade Headquarters and Headquarters Company
  - 101st Mechanized Infantry Battalion (K21)
  - 122nd Mechanized Infantry Battalion (K21)
  - 137th Mechanized Infantry Battalion (K200A1)
  - Support Battalion
- 60th Mechanized Infantry Brigade (formerly under 20th Mechanized Infantry Division)
  - 60th Brigade Headquarters and Headquarters Company
  - 26th Tank Battalion (K2)
  - 32nd Tank Battalion (K2)
  - 107th Mechanized Infantry Battalion (K21)
  - Support Battalion
- 73rd Mechanized Infantry Brigade (formerly under 26th Mechanized Infantry Division)
  - 73rd Brigade Headquarters and Headquarters Company
  - 57th Tank Battalion (K1A2)
  - 123rd Mechanized Infantry Battalion (K21)
  - 125th Mechanized Infantry Battalion (K200A1)
  - Support Battalion
- Division Artillery Brigade
  - Division Artillery Brigade Headquarters and Headquarters Battery
  - 50th Artillery Battalion (K-55A1 155 mm)
  - 95th Artillery Battalion (K9 155 mm)
  - 228th Artillery Battalion (K9 155 mm)
  - 231st Artillery Battalion (K-55A1 155 mm)

== Unit of the VII Maneuver Corps ==
- Capital Mechanized Infantry Division
- 2nd Quick Response Division
- 11th Maneuver Division

== See also ==
- Republic of Korea Army
