= 11th Maneuver Division =

- 11기동사단
- 11th Maneuver Division insignia
- Active: August 27, 1950 – Present
- Country: South Korea
- Branch: Republic of Korea Army
- Type: Mechanized Infantry
- Role: Offensive; Maneuver warfare
- Size: Division
- Part of: VII Maneuver Corps
- Garrison/HQ: Hongcheon, Gangwon Province
- Nickname: 화랑 (Hwa-rang / Flowering Knights)
- March: 11th Division Hymn
- Engagements: Korean War: Battle of Mt. Seorak; Battle of Hyangnobong; Gangneung submarine infiltration incident

Commanders
- Current commander: Maj. Gen. Park Hu-sung

- 11th Maneuver Division
- Hangul: 십일기동사단
- Hanja: 十一機動師團
- RR: Sibil gidong sadan
- MR: Sibil kidong sadan

The 11th Maneuver Division (Korean: 11기동사단; Hanja: 十一機動師團), also known as Flowering Knights Division (화랑부대; 花郞部隊), is a military formation of the Republic of Korea Army and is unit is one of four divisions under the command of the VII Maneuver Corps. Before the unit was renamed on January 1, 2021, it was called the 11th Mechanized Infantry Division.

== History ==
The 11th Maneuver Division was established in Yeongcheon on August 27, 1950, during the Korean War. It is also a unit that caused the massacre of geochang civilians under the order of Choe Deok-sin, who was the division commander of the 11th Division in February 1951. In the Korean War, the 11th Division fought mainly on the eastern front, such as Mt. Seorak and Hyangrobong. After the end of the Korean War, the military base was moved to Hwacheon.

At the time of the Gangneung submarine infiltration incident in 1996, the 11th Infantry Division was deployed with the 2nd Infantry Division to fight, and one soldier from the 11th Infantry Division was killed during the battle.

== Organization ==
Three specialized divisions were designated for the Army under the Army Division Specialization Plan established in 1967, of which the 11th Infantry Division was converted to a landing division for landing operations on January 23, 1968, but later returned to the general infantry division when the Army's specialized division system was suspended. In 2004, the 11th Infantry Division became the fifth South Korean Army unit to be reorganized into a mechanized unit. As of December 1, 2016, the 11th Mechanized Infantry Division was incorporated as a subordinate unit of the VII Maneuver Corps, and was subsequently reorganized into a subordinate unit directly under Ground Operations Command under the integration plan of 1st Operations Command and 3rd Operations Command. The 20th Mechanized Infantry Division, which was disbanded on November 29, 2019, was merged into the 11th Mechanized Infantry Division. On 1 January 2021, the 11th Mechanized Infantry Division was renamed the 11th Maneuver Division.

- Headquarters:
  - Engineer Battalion
  - Intelligence Battalion
  - Support Battalion
  - Armored Reconnaissance Battalion
  - Medical Battalion
  - Signal Battalion
  - CBR Battalion
  - Air Defense Battalion
  - Military Police Battalion
  - Replacement Company
  - Headquarters Company
- 9th Mechanized Infantry Brigade
  - 9th Brigade Headquarters and Headquarters Company
  - 56th Tank Battalion (K2)
  - 127th Mechanized Infantry Battalion (K21)
  - 128th Mechanized Infantry Battalion (K21)
  - Support Battalion
- 13th Mechanized Infantry Brigade
  - 13th Brigade Headquarters and Headquarters Company
  - 36th Tank Battalion (K2)
  - 112th Mechanized Infantry Battalion (K21)
  - 129th Mechanized Infantry Battalion (K21)
  - Support Battalion
- 61st Mechanized Infantry Brigade
  - 61st Brigade Headquarters and Headquarters Company
  - 12th Tank Battalion (K2)
  - 108th Mechanized Infantry Battalion (K21)
  - 111th Mechanized Infantry Battalion (K21)
  - Support Battalion
- Division Artillery Brigade
  - Division Artillery Brigade Headquarters and Headquarters Battery
  - 55th Artillery Battalion (K9 155mm)
  - 78th Artillery Battalion (K9 155mm)
  - 91st Artillery Battalion (K9 155mm)
  - 955th Artillery Battalion (K9 155mm)
  - Multiple Rocket Artillery Battalion (K239 Chunmoo)

== Unit of the VII Maneuver Corps ==
- Capital Mechanized Infantry Division
- 2nd Quick Response Division
- 8th Maneuver Division

== See also ==
- Republic of Korea Army
