= Battle of the Bowling Alley =

UN forces defeated North Korean forces 1950

Coordinates: 36°04′N 128°32′E

- Part of the Battle of Cheonpyeong
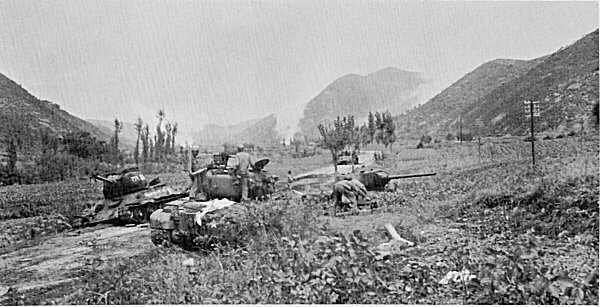
- US tanks advance into the Bowling Alley on August 21.
Date	August 21, 1950
Location	Gasan, Chilgok, South Korea
Result	United Nations victory

Belligerents
United Nations: United States; South Korea	North Korea

In the Battle of the Bowling Alley (August 21, 1950), United Nations Command (UN) forces defeated North Korean forces early in the Korean War near the city of Taegu, South Korea. The battle took place in a narrow valley, dubbed the "Bowling Alley", north of Taegu. It followed a week of fighting between the Korean People's Army (KPA) 13th Division and the Republic of Korea Army's (ROKA) 1st Division along the latter's last defensible line in the hills north of the city. Reinforcements, including the US Army's 27th and 23rd Infantry Regiments were committed to bolster the ROKA defenses. This battle and several others were smaller engagements of the Battle of Pusan Perimeter.

For another week, KPA divisions launched all the troops they had in massed attacks against the ROKA and US lines. Their attacks, which usually occurred at night and were supported by armor and artillery, advanced with infantry and tanks in close support of one another. Each KPA attack ran into well-established UN lines, where US tanks, mines and entrenched infantry were positioned to counter them. Strikes by US aircraft ravaged the attacking KPA. The fighting was fierce with many casualties on both sides, particularly where the KPA and ROK fought one another. The repeated attacks eventually broke and pushed back the ROKA forces. The KPA continued their push against the Pusan Perimeter until they were outflanked in the Battle of Inchon.

== Background ==
=== Outbreak of war ===
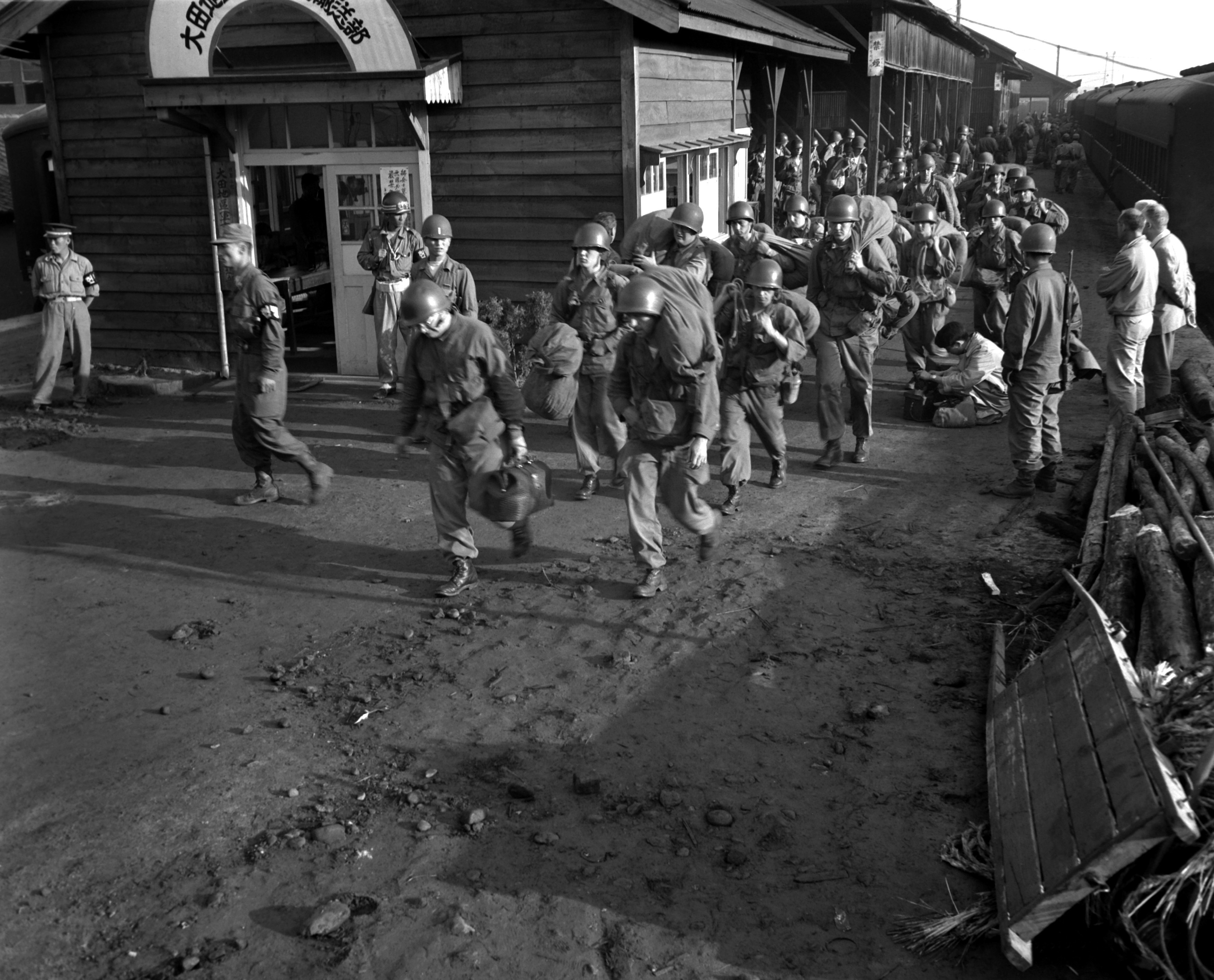
Task Force Smith arrives in South Korea.

Following the invasion of South Korea by North Korea on June 25, 1950, the United Nations voted to use force to defend South Korea. The United States simultaneously committed ground forces to the Korean peninsula with the goal of pushing back the North Korean invasion and preventing South Korea from collapsing. But US forces in the Far East had been steadily decreasing since the end of World War II, five years earlier, and at the time the closest force was the 24th Infantry Division, headquartered in Japan. The division was understrength, and most of its equipment was antiquated due to reductions in military spending. Nevertheless, the 24th was ordered to South Korea.

The 24th Infantry Division was the first US unit sent into Korea with the mission to take the initial "shock" of KPA advances, delaying much larger KPA units to buy time to allow reinforcements to arrive. The division fought for several weeks while the 1st Cavalry, 7th Infantry and 25th Infantry Divisions and Eighth United States Army supporting units were arriving. Advance elements of the 24th Division were badly defeated in the Battle of Osan on July 5, the first encounter between US and KPA forces. For the first month after the defeat at Osan, the 24th Infantry Division was repeatedly defeated and forced south by superior KPA numbers and equipment. The regiments of the division were systematically pushed south in engagements around Chochiwon, Chonan, and Pyongtaek. The 24th Division was finally annihilated in the Battle of Taejon, but was able to delay the KPA forces until July 20. By that time, the Eighth Army's force of combat troops were roughly equal to KPA forces attacking the region, with new UN units arriving every day.

=== North Korean advance ===
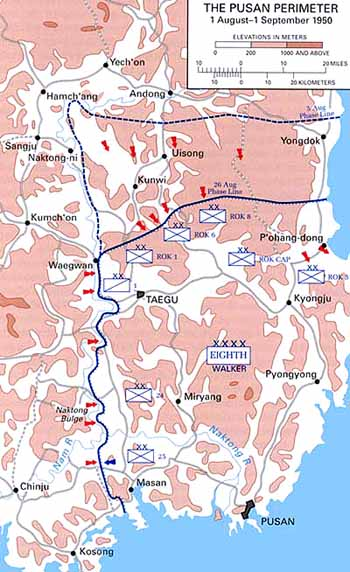
Tactical map of the Pusan Perimeter in August 1950. The fight at P'ohang-dong occurred between North and South Korean forces on the northeastern line.

After the fight at Daejon, UN forces were pushed back repeatedly before finally halting the KPA advance in a series of engagements in the southern section of the country. Forces of the 3rd Battalion, 29th Infantry, newly arrived in the country, were wiped out at Hadong in a coordinated ambush by North Korean forces on July 27, opening a pass to the Busan area from the west. Soon after, North Korean forces took Chinju, east of Hadong, pushing back the US 19th Infantry Regiment and leaving routes to Pusan open to direct KPA attacks. The UN formations were subsequently able to defeat the KPA in the Battle of the Notch on August 2, halting their advance from the west. Suffering mounting losses, the KPA force withdrew for several days to re-equip and receive reinforcements. This granted both sides a reprieve to prepare for the attack on the Pusan Perimeter.

=== Daegu ===
Meanwhile, the Eighth Army commander Lieutenant general Walton Walker had established Taegu as his headquarters. At the center of the Pusan Perimeter line, Taegu stood at the entrance to the Naktong River valley, an area where KPA forces could advance in large numbers in close support. The natural barriers provided by the Naktong River to the south and the mountainous terrain to the north converged around Taegu, a transportation hub and the last major South Korean city aside from Pusan itself to remain in UN hands. From south to north, the city was defended by the US 1st Cavalry Division, the ROK 1st Division and the 6th Division, which were under the command of ROKA II Corps. The 1st Cavalry Division was spread out along a long line on the Naktong River to the south, with its 5th and 8th Cavalry Regiments holding a 24,000-meter (79,000 ft) line along the river south of Waegwan, facing west. The 7th Cavalry Regiment held position to the east in reserve, along with artillery forces, ready to reinforce anywhere a KPA crossing could be attempted. The ROKA 1st Division held a northwest-facing line in the mountains immediately north of the city while the ROK 6th Division held position to the east, guarding the narrow valley holding the Kunwi road into the Pusan Perimeter area.

Five KPA divisions amassed around Taegu to oppose the UN forces in the city. From south to north, the 10th, 3rd, 15th, 13th, and 1st North Korean Divisions occupied a wide line encircling Daegu from Tuksong-dong and around Waegwan to Kunwi. The KPA planned to use the natural corridor of the Naktong River valley from Sangju to Taegu as its main axis of attack for the next push south, so the KPA divisions all eventually moved through this valley, crossing the Naktong at different areas along the low ground. Elements of the KPA 105th Armored Division also supported the attack.

== Prelude ==
=== US and ROK forces assemble ===
During mid-August, the US 27th Infantry Regiment was mopping up KPA resistance from the southern part of the Naktong Bulge area to counter a KPA attack there. The regiment, temporarily attached to the US 24th Infantry Division, was recalled by the Eighth Army when a new KPA threat formed to the north of Taegu, alarming Walker. Acting on the threat, Walker relieved the regiment from the 24th Infantry Division on August 14 and the next day ordered it northward to Kyongsan as a reserve force. Arriving at Kyongsan on August 16, Colonel John H. Michaelis, 27th Infantry's commander, was ordered to reconnoiter routes east, north, northwest, and west of Kyongsan and counter any KPA attacks from these directions. During the day, two KPA T-34 tanks came through the ROKA 1st Division lines 12 miles (19 km) north of Taegu at Tabu-dong, but ROK 3.5-inch bazooka teams knocked out both of them. The ROKA 1st Division, also in the area, was ordered to assemble in the hills around the road and wait for reinforcements or make a last stand if needed to prevent the KPA from coming any closer to Taegu. To its east was the ROKA 6th Division and to its west was the Naktong River.

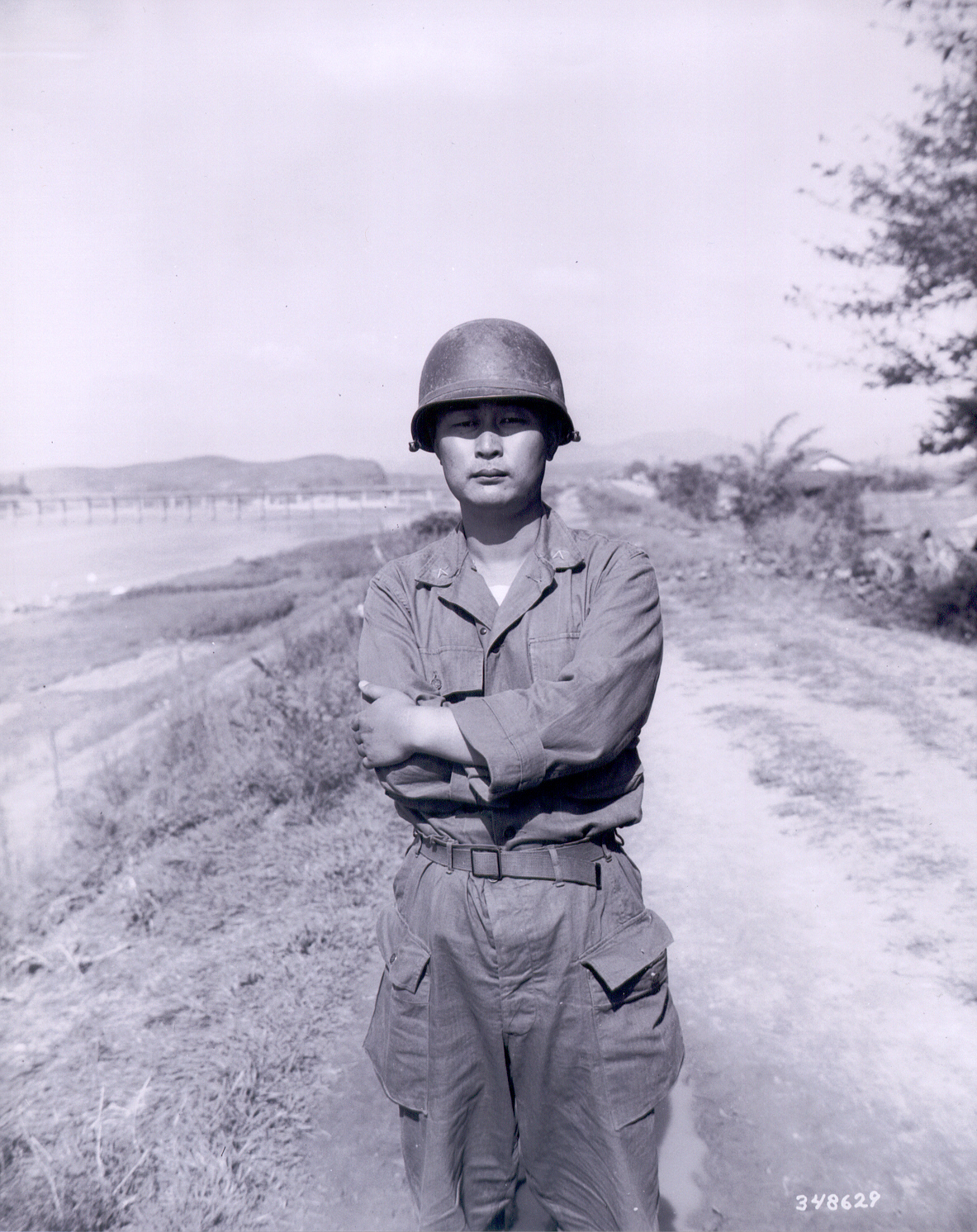
ROK Brigadier General Paik Sun Yup.

At 12:00 the next day, August 17, Eighth Army ordered the 27th Infantry to move its headquarters and a reinforced battalion "without delay" to a point across the Kumho River 3 miles (4.8 km) north of Taegu on the road from Tabu-dong to Sangju "to secure Taegu from enemy penetration" from that direction. South Korean sources reported a KPA regiment, led by six T-34 tanks, had entered the village of Kumhwa, 2 miles (3.2 km) north of Tabu-dong. The 1st Battalion, 27th Infantry, a platoon of the Heavy Mortar Company, and most of the 8th Field Artillery Battalion moved north to Ch'ilgok where the ROKA 1st Division command post was located. By nightfall, the entire 27th Regiment was north of Taegu on the Tabu-dong road, reinforced by C Company, 73rd Tank Battalion. US Army commanders also ordered the 37th Field Artillery Battalion to move from the area around Kyongju and P'ohang-dong, where a heavy battle had been in progress for days, for attachment to the US 27th Infantry Regiment in order to reinforce the 8th Field Artillery Battalion above Taegu. It arrived there the next day. At the front, ROK 1st Division commander Brigadier general Paik Sun-yup assumed senior command of the 27th Infantry and the other US units, to the chagrin of Michaelis.

=== North Korean forces assemble ===
In its engagements during the Perimeter battle, the KPA 13th Division, with 9,500 men, had forced ROKA troops into the Tabu-dong corridor and started advancing on Taegu. This division had battled the ROKA 11th and 12th Regiments in the Yuhak-san area for a week before it broke through to the corridor on August 17. A regimental commander of the division said later it suffered 1,500 casualties in the process. On August 18, the 13th Division was concentrated mostly west of the road just north of Tabu-dong.

To the west of the KPA 13th Division, the KPA 15th Division with 5,000 men was also deployed on Yuhak-san. It, too, had begun battling the ROKA 1st Division, but thus far only in minor engagements. The KPA High Command then ordered the KPA 15th Division to move from its position northwest of Tabu-dong eastward, to the Yongch'on front, where the KPA 8th Division had tried and failed to advance to the Taegu lateral corridor. The KPA 15th Division left the Yuhak-san area on August 20. Meanwhile, the KPA 1st Division, to the east of the 13th, advanced to the Kunwi area, 25 miles (40 km) north of Taegu. The KPA command ordered it to proceed to the Tabu-dong area and maneuver astride the 13th Division for the attack on Taegu down the Tabu-dong corridor. At the same time, the KPA received their only substantial tank reinforcements during the Pusan Perimeter fighting. On August 15, the KPA 105th Armored Division received 21 new T-34 tanks and 200 troop replacements, which it distributed to the divisions attacking Taegu. The tank regiment with the KPA 13th Division reportedly had 14 T-34 tanks.

On August 18, the KPA 13th Division was astride the Sangju–Taegu road just above Tabu-dong and only 13 miles (21 km) from Taegu. The Eighth Army ordered the 27th Infantry Regiment to attack north along the road to counter the threat. At the same time, two regiments of the ROKA 1st Division were to attack along high ground on either side of the road. The plan called for a limited-objective attack to restore the ROKA 1st Division lines in the vicinity of Sokchok, a village 4 miles (6.4 km) north of Tabu-dong. M26 Pershing tanks of C Company, 73rd Tank Battalion, and two batteries of the 37th Field Artillery Battalion were to support the 27th Infantry in the attack.

=== Terrain ===
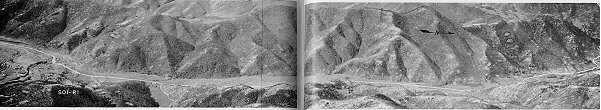
The Bowling Alley, 1950

In front of the 27th Infantry position, the poplar-lined Taegu–Sangju road ran northward in the narrow mountain valley. A stream on the west closely paralleled the road, which was nearly straight on a north-south axis through the 27th Infantry position and for some distance northward. This stretch of the road later became known as the "Bowling Alley." About 1 mile (1.6 km) in front of the 27th Infantry position the road forked at a small village called Ch'onp'yong-dong; the western prong was the main Sangju road, the eastern one was the road to Kunwi. At the road fork, the Sangju road bends to the northwest in a long curve. The village of Sinjumak lay on this curve a short distance north of the fork. Hills protected it against direct fire from the 27th Infantry position. It was there that the KPA tanks remained hidden during the daytime.

Rising from the valley on the west side was the Yuhak-san mountain range which swept up to a height of 2,700 feet (820 m). On the east, a similar mountain range rose to a height of 2,400 feet (730 m), culminating 2.5 miles (4.0 km) southward in a mountain called Ka-san, more than 2,900 feet (880 m) high at its walled summit. The Kunwi and Sangju roads from the northeast and northwest entered the natural and easy corridor between Yuhak-san and Ka-san at Ch'onp'yong-dong, leading into the Taegu basin. The battles in the Bowling Alley occurred south of this road junction.

== Battle ==
=== August 21 attack ===
That evening, the 27th Infantry placed two belts of antipersonnel mines and trip flares across the road and stream bed 250 feet (76 m) and 150 feet (46 m) in front of its positions in the valley. After dusk, the KPA began shelling the general area of the 27th Infantry positions until just before midnight. ROKA troops had planned to mount an attack, but it became apparent that the KPA would hit first. Then the KPA 13th Division launched a major attack against the entire UN front in and around the valley. Nine US tanks supported the infantry troops in the valley. Because it was on higher ground and positioned in front of all the other American units, C Company on the left of the road usually was the first to detect an approaching attack. That evening the C Company commander telephoned the regimental headquarters that he could hear tanks. When the artillery fired an illuminating shell he was able to count 19 KPA vehicles in the attacking column on the road. The tanks and self-propelled guns approached the American positions, firing rapidly. Most of their shells landed in the rear areas. KPA infantry moved forward on both sides of the road. Simultaneously, other KPA units attacked the ROK troops on the high ridges flanking the valley.

American artillery and mortar fire bombarded the KPA, trying to separate the tanks from the infantry. US machine gun fire opened on the KPA infantry only after they had entered the mine field and were at close range. The US M26 tanks in the front line held their fire until the KPA tanks came very close. One of the American tanks knocked out the lead KPA tank and a bazooka team from F Company knocked out a towed gun, the third vehicle in column. The trapped second tank was disabled by bazooka fire and abandoned by its crew. It was during this fight that the battle received its name. The US troops at the battle noted the tank shells being fired up and down the valley in the dark looked "like bowling balls."

Artillery and 90 mm tank fire destroyed seven more KPA T-34s, three more SU-76 self-propelled guns, and several trucks and personnel carriers. This night battle, which was at times very intense, lasted about five hours. The US B Battery, 8th Field Artillery Battalion alone fired 1,661 105 mm rounds, the 4.2-inch mortar platoon fired 902 rounds, the 81 mm mortar platoon fired 1,200 rounds, and F Company, 27th Infantry fired 385 60 mm mortar rounds. The KPA column was completely destroyed. US patrols after daylight estimated the KPA had suffered 1,300 casualties in the fight. Eleven prisoners captured by the patrol said the action had decimated their units and that the division was only at 25 percent strength.

== Aftermath ==
The confirmed KPA losses from August 18 to 25 included 13 T-34 tanks, six SU-76 self-propelled guns, and 23 trucks. The KPA 13th Division's troops suffered heavy casualties during the fight, with an estimated 3,000 killed, wounded and captured. The division withdrew to rebuild. The North Koreans' total casualties from August 12 to 25 were 5,690 killed.

US losses during the battle were extremely light; unusual for fighting at a time in which other UN offensive forces were paying a heavy price when making similar pushes against the KPA. The US infantry forces suffered only five killed and 54 wounded in the 27th Infantry, plus three killed and 16 wounded in the 23rd Infantry. This brought the total US casualty count to 8 dead, 70 wounded. ROKA troops suffered much more heavily during the fight. An estimated 2,300 soldiers were killed in the fighting; 2,244 enlisted men and 56 officers. However, these losses were not crippling, as volunteers poured in from the surrounding countryside to fight for the ROKA.
