= Battle of Ka-san =

Part of the Korean War

- Part of the Battle of Pusan Perimeter
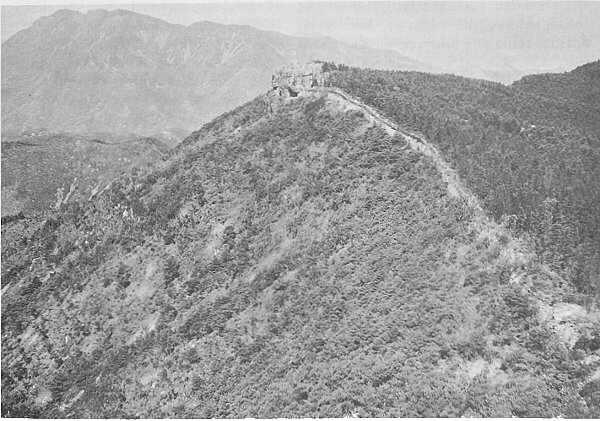
- The walled Gasansanseong Fortress on Hill 902.
Date	September 1–15, 1950
Location	Ka-san (Ka mountain), Chilgok County, North Gyeongsang Province, South Korea 36°2′14″N 128°34′57″E
Result	United Nations victory

Belligerents
United Nations: United States; South Korea	North Korea

Commanders and leaders
(United States) Hobart R. Gay (South Korea) Paik Sun Yup	Hong Rim; Choi Yong Chin

Units involved
(United States) 1st Cavalry Division (South Korea) 1st Infantry Division	1st Division; 3rd Division; 13th Division

Strength
US: 15,000; South Korea: 10,500	14,000

Casualties and losses
US: ~600 killed ~2,000 wounded South Korea: heavy	10,000+ killed, wounded and captured

The Battle of Ka-san was an engagement between United Nations Command (UN) and North Korean forces early in the Korean War from September 1 to September 15, 1950, in the vicinity of Ka-san (Ka mountain), Chilgok County in South Korea. It was a part of the Battle of Pusan Perimeter, and was one of several large engagements fought simultaneously. The battle ended in a victory for the United Nations after large numbers of United States Army (US) and Republic of Korea Army (ROKA) troops repelled a strong Korean People's Army (KPA) attack.

Attempting to capture Taegu as part of the Great Naktong Offensive, the KPA 1st and 13th Divisions advanced to the hill masses north of the city where they confronted the US 1st Cavalry Division and the ROKA 1st Division. The KPA sought to occupy a number of hill masses, most prominently Hill 902, known to South Koreans as Ka-san, for the ancient fortress situated atop it.

In two weeks of fighting in and around the fortress, the KPA were able to gradually push back the UN forces from Ka-san and Hills 755 and 314 to the south, but the UN forces held out strongly and the KPA were not able to quickly consolidate their gains. The UN forces defended the ground tenaciously, even assigning a battalion of engineers to fight on the front lines, eventually preventing the KPA from advancing long enough for the KPA to be outflanked by the Inchon landings on 15 September and on 16 September the UN forces began their breakout from the Pusan Perimeter which drove the KPA from the area.

== Background ==
=== Pusan Perimeter ===
From the outbreak of the Korean War and the invasion of South Korea by the North, the KPA had enjoyed superiority in both manpower and equipment over both the ROKA and the UN forces dispatched to South Korea to prevent it from collapsing. The KPA tactics were to aggressively pursue ROKA/UN forces on all avenues of approach south and to engage them aggressively, attacking from the front and initiating a double envelopment of both flanks of the unit, which allowed the KPA to surround and cut off the opposing force, which would then be forced to retreat in disarray, often leaving behind much of its equipment. From their initial June 25 offensive to fights in July and early August, the KPA used these tactics to effectively defeat any ROKA/UN force and push it south. However, when the ROKA/UN forces, under the Eighth United States Army, established the Pusan Perimeter in August, the ROKA/UN troops held a continuous line along the peninsula which KPA troops could not flank, and their advantages in numbers decreased daily as the superior UN logistical system brought in more troops and supplies to the UN forces.

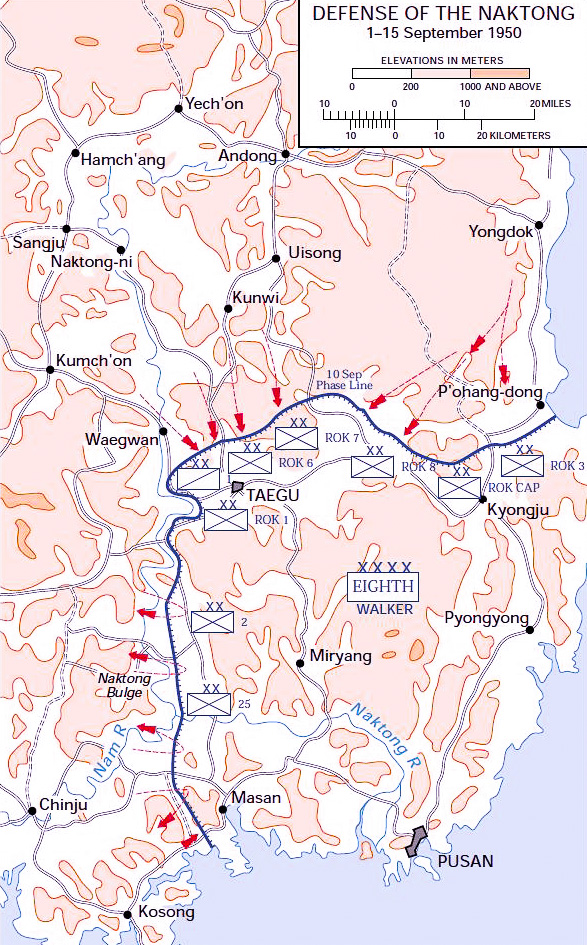
Map of the Pusan Perimeter Defensive line in September 1950 the Kyongju corridor is the northeasternmost sector.

When the KPA approached the Pusan Perimeter on August 5, they attempted the same frontal assault technique on the four main avenues of approach into the perimeter. Throughout August, the KPA 6th Division, and later the KPA 7th Division engaged the US 25th Infantry Division at the Battle of Masan, initially repelling a UN counteroffensive before countering with battles at Komam-ni and Battle Mountain. These attacks stalled as UN forces, well equipped and with plenty of reserves, repeatedly repelled KPA attacks. North of Masan, the KPA 4th Division and the US 24th Infantry Division sparred in the Naktong Bulge area. In the First Battle of Naktong Bulge, the KPA division was unable to hold its bridgehead across the river as large numbers of US reserve forces were brought in to repel it, and on August 19, the KPA 4th Division was forced back across the river with 50 percent casualties. In the Taegu region, five KPA divisions were repulsed by three UN divisions in several attempts to attack the city during the Battle of Taegu. Particularly heavy fighting took place at the Battle of the Bowling Alley where the KPA 13th Division was almost completely destroyed in the attack. On the east coast, three more KPA divisions were repulsed by the ROKA at P'ohang-dong during the Battle of P'ohang-dong. All along the front, the KPA troops were reeling from these defeats, the first time in the war their tactics were not working.

=== September push ===
In planning its new offensive, the KPA command decided any attempt to flank the ROKA/UN force was impossible thanks to the support of the UN naval forces. Instead, they opted to use frontal attack to breach the perimeter and collapse it as the only hope of achieving success in the battle. Fed by intelligence from the Soviet Union the North Koreans were aware the UN forces were building up along the Pusan Perimeter and that it must conduct an offensive soon or it could not win the battle. A secondary objective was to surround Taegu and destroy the UN units in that city. As part of this mission, the KPA would first cut the supply lines to Taegu.

On August 20, the KPA commands distributed operations orders to their subordinate units. The plan called for a simultaneous five-prong attack against the ROKA/UN lines. These attacks would overwhelm the ROKA/UN defenders and allow the KPA to break through the lines in at least one place to force the ROKA/UN forces back. Five battle groupings were ordered. The center attack called for the KPA 3rd, 13th and 1st Divisions to break through the US 1st Cavalry Division and ROKA 1st Division to Taegu.

== Battle ==
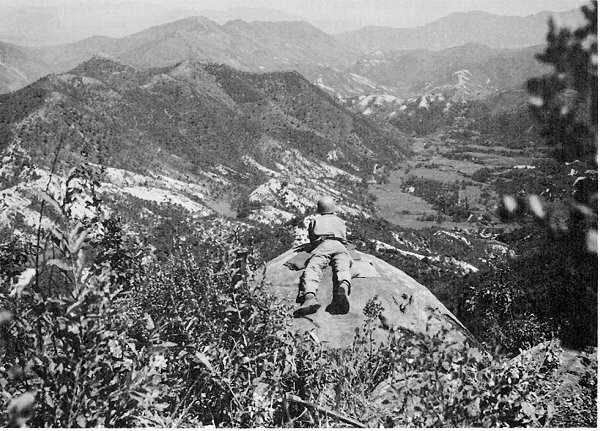
US Troops observe North Korean-held Hill 518 during the Battle of Tabu-dong.

Simultaneous with their attack at Ka-san, ROKA/UN and KPA units were similarly deadlocked a short distance away in the Battle of Tabu-dong. In that sector, KPA Major Kim Song Jun of the 19th Regiment, 13th Division had defected to the ROKA/UN side on September 1. He reported that a full-scale KPA attack was to begin at dusk that day. The 13th Division, he said, had just taken in 4,000 replacements, 2,000 of them without weapons, and was now back to a strength of approximately 9,000 men. Upon receiving this intelligence, 1st Cavalry Division commander Major general Hobart R. Gay alerted all of his division's front-line units to be prepared for the attack. ROKA 1st Division commander Major general Paik Sun Yup also braced his men for attack.

=== North Korean attack ===
Hard on the heels of Kim's warning that the KPA attack would strike the night of September 2, the attack hit with full force in the Bowling Alley area north of Taegu. The attack caught the US 8th Cavalry Regiment unprepared at Sangju. The division was poorly deployed along the road to that town, lacking a reserve force to counterattack effectively. The KPA struck the 2nd Battalion, 8th Cavalry, the night of September 2–3 on Hill 448 west of the Bowling Alley and 2 miles (3.2 km) north of Tabu-dong, and overran it. On the right, E Company, although not under attack, was cut off and had to withdraw. The commanding officer of the 3rd Battalion placed I Company in a blocking position just north of Tabu-dong astride the road. There, two KPA T-34 tanks and some infantry struck it at 02:00 on September 3. In this action, I Company suffered many casualties but repelled the attack. The overrun 2nd Battalion withdrew through the 3rd Battalion which had assembled hastily in a defensive position south of Tabu-dong. During the day, elements of the KPA 1st Division forced the 8th Cavalry I&R Platoon and a detachment of National Police from the Walled City of Ka-san on the crest of Hill 902 (36.0372°N 128.5825°E), 4 miles (6.4 km) east of Tabu-dong. On September 3, therefore, the UN command, the Eighth United States Army lost both Tabu-dong and Hill 902, the dominant mountain-top 10 miles (16 km) north of Taegu.

The North Koreans now concentrated artillery north of Hill 902 and, although its fire was light and sporadic, it did cause minor damage in the 99th Field Artillery positions. This sudden surge of the North Koreans southward toward Taegu concerned the Eighth Army commander, Lieutenant general Walton Walker. Walker ordered an ROKA battalion from the Taegu Replacement Training Center to a position in the rear of the 8th Cavalry, and the 1st Cavalry Division organized Task Force Allen, to be commanded by Assistant Division Commander Brigadier general Frank A. Allen, Jr. This task force comprised two provisional battalions formed of division headquarters and technical service troops, the division band, the replacement company, and other miscellaneous troops. It was to be used in combat as an emergency force should the North Koreans break through to the edge of Taegu.

=== US counterattack on Ka-san ===
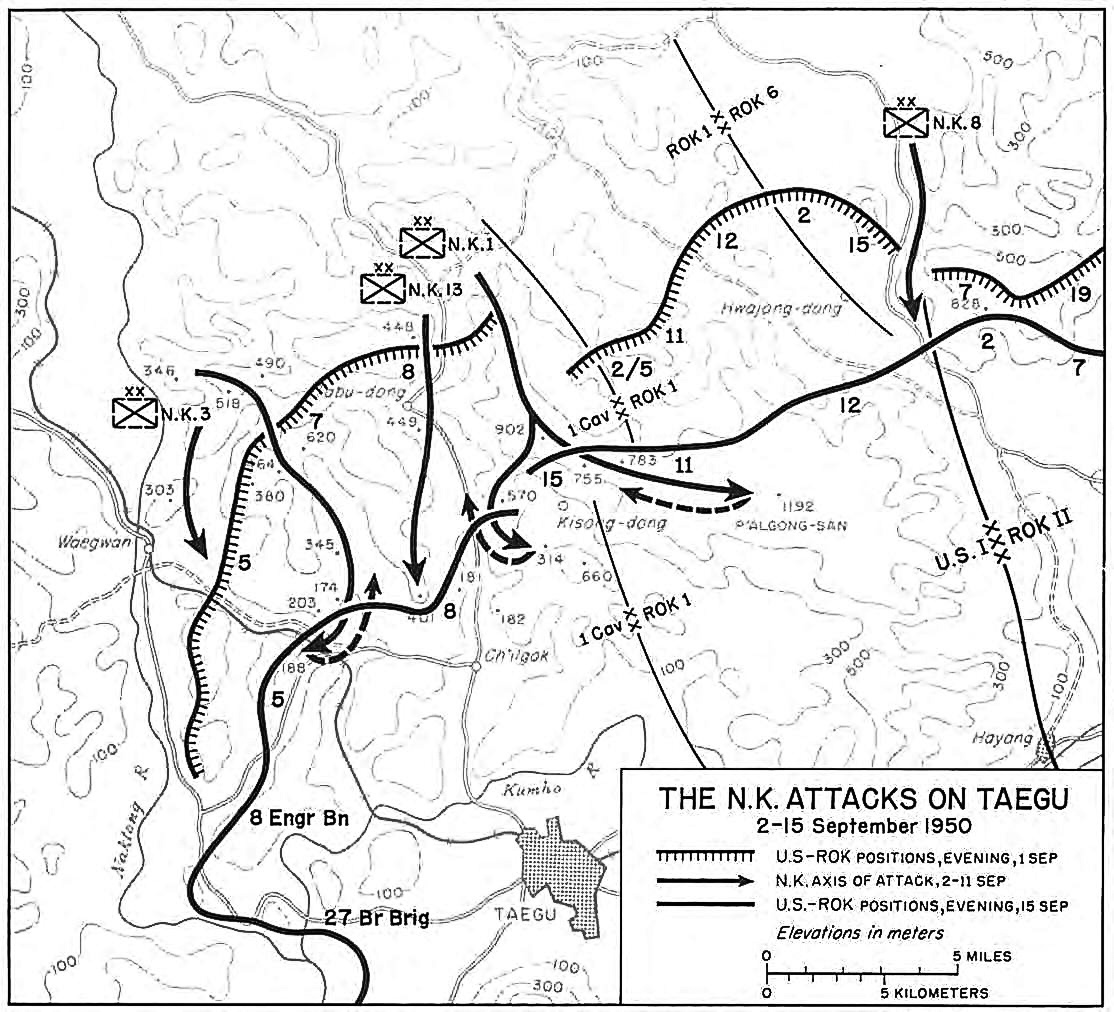
North Korean attacks on Taegu, September 1950

Eighth Army countered the KPA advance down the Tabu-dong road by ordering the 1st Cavalry Division to recapture and defend Hill 902. Hill 902 gave observation all the way south through Eighth Army positions into the city, and, in KPA hands, could be used for general intelligence purposes and to direct artillery and mortar fire. Hill 902 was too far distant from the Tabu-dong road to dominate it; otherwise it would have controlled this main communication route. The shortage of KPA artillery and mortar ammunition reduced the advantages the peak held as an observation point for the KPA.

Despite being popularly known as the "walled city," there was no walled city on the crest of Ka-san in 1950. Ka-san, or Hill 902, the 3,000-foot-high (910 m) mountain which differs from most high peaks in this part of Korea in having an oval-shaped semi-level area on its summit. This oval is a part of a 1-mile-long (1.6 km) ridge-like crest, varying from 200 yards (180 m) to 800 yards (730 m) in width, which slopes down from the peak at 902 metres (2,959 ft) to approximately 755 metres (2,477 ft) at its southeastern end. On all sides of this ridge crest the mountain slopes drop precipitously. In ancient times, Koreans had built a 30 feet (9.1 m) stone wall around the crest and had converted the summit into a fortress. Most of the summit in 1950 was covered with a dense growth of scrub brush and small pine trees. There were a few small terraced fields. Koreans knew Ka-san as the "Sacred Mountain". Near the northern end of the crest still stood the Buddhist Poguk Temple.

When the 1st Cavalry Division on August 29 assumed responsibility for the old ROKA 1st Division sector north of Taegu it sent a patrol from the I&R Platoon to the top of Ka-san. There the patrol found 156 National Police. There was some discussion between Gay and Walker about whether the 1st Cavalry Division or the ROKA 1st Division should have the responsibility for the mountain. Gay maintained that his understrength division with a 35 miles (56 km) front was already overextended and could not extend eastward beyond the hills immediately adjacent to the Tabu-dong road. Uncertainty as to final responsibility for Ka-san ended on the afternoon of September 3 after the KPA had seized the mountain.

Colonel Ernest V. Holmes, Chief of Staff of the 1st Cavalry Division, was notified that the 1st Cavalry Division had responsibility for the Walled City. Holmes replied he would send a company of engineers to Ka-san. Holmes ordered Lieutenant colonel William C. Holley, commanding officer of the 8th Engineer Combat Battalion, to report to Colonel Raymond D. Palmer, commanding the 8th Cavalry Regiment. That afternoon Palmer in his command post on the Tabu-dong road outlined to Holley and the commanding officers of D Company, 8th Engineer Combat Battalion, and E Company, 8th Cavalry, his attack plan to regain control of Ka-san. The Engineer company, commanded by First lieutenant John T. Kennedy, was to lead the attack, E Company following. Once the force had gained the crest and E Company had established itself in defensive positions, the Engineer company was to come off the mountain. Many of the men in D Company were veteran infantrymen who had fought in World War II.

That evening, D Company loaded into trucks traveled north to the assembly area through a heavy rain. On the way they met two truckloads of National Police going south, some of them wounded. These were the police who, together with the detachment of the I&R Platoon, had been driven off Ka-san that afternoon. After waiting in the rain awhile for orders, the Engineer company turned around and went back to camp.

=== Engineer attack ===
The next morning, September 4, D Company received orders to move immediately as an infantry force to Ka-san. The company carried no rations since E Company, 8th Cavalry, was to bring food and water later. The engineer troops arrived at their assembly area near the village of Kisong-dong 2 miles (3.2 km) east of the Tabu-dong road, where Holley set up a communications command post. Sniper fire came in on the men as they moved up the trail to the base of Ka-san's steep slope. Word was given to the company that there were about 75 disorganized KPA troops on Ka-san. But actually, during the afternoon and evening of September 3, the KPA 2nd Battalion, 2nd Regiment, 1st Division, had occupied the summit of Ka-san.

The engineer company started its attack up the mountain about noon of September 4, following a trail up a southern spur. The 1st Platoon was in the lead, single file, followed by the 2nd and 3rd Platoons. Palmer considered the mission so important that he and his military intelligence officer, Captain Rene J. Guiraud, accompanied the engineers. Platoon Sergeant James N. Vandygriff, 2nd Platoon, D Company, in a brief conversation with Holley as he went ahead of the latter on his way up the trail, said he thought the attack was a "suicide mission".

Less than 1 mile (1.6 km) up the trail, D Company came under machine gun fire from its right flank, which inflicted several casualties. Kennedy rejected Vandygriff's request to take a squad and knock out the gun, so the file got past the line of fire as best it could until BAR fire from the 3rd Platoon silenced the weapon. Farther up the trail another KPA machine gun fired from the right along the trail and held up the advance until US artillery fire silenced it. The file of men left the trail-like road, which dead-ended, dropped over into a ravine on the left, and continued the climb. KPA mortar fire killed two men and wounded eight or ten others in this phase of the ascent. At this time the 2nd Platoon leader collapsed from a kidney ailment and command passed to Vandygriff. Vandygriff led his platoon, now at the head of the company, on up the gully and at about 17:00, came through a tunnel under a small ridge and the stone wall into the bowl-shaped summit of Hill 755 (36.026°N 128.61°E), the southern arm of the Hill 902 crest. The 2nd and 3rd Platoons soon arrived, in that order. Near the top, Palmer received radio orders from Gay to come off the mountain; Gay had not known that Palmer had accompanied the attack.

=== Defense of Ka-san ===
Kennedy placed the 90 men of his company in position facing in an arc from west to northeast; the 2nd Platoon took the left flank near the stone wall, the 1st Platoon took the center position on a wooded knoll, and the 3rd Platoon the right flank at the edge of a woods. Just as he reached the top, Second lieutenant Thomas T. Jones, commanding the 3rd Platoon, saw and heard three KPA mortars fire from 1,000 yards (910 m) away on a grassy ridge to the east. He suggested to Kennedy that artillery fire be directed on these mortars, but Kennedy did not act on the suggestion. Kennedy established his command post inside the tunnel behind the 2nd Platoon position. The D Company position was entirely within the area enclosed by the stone wall, which was nearly intact except on the northeast near the 3rd Platoon position where it had crumbled and was covered with brush and trees. Jones pointed out to his platoon sergeant and squad leaders where he wanted them to take position at the edge of the woods facing the KPA mortars he had seen on the grassy ridge beyond. He then remained a few minutes in conversation with Kennedy. A few minutes later Jones joined his 3rd Squad men at the edge of the woods. They told him that the platoon sergeant and the rest had continued on toward the narrow grassy ridge. One of the squad members called Jones to the edge of the woods and pointed out 12 well-camouflaged KPA soldiers, one of them carrying a machine gun, coming down the narrow ridge toward them from the mortar position. This group was a security force for the mortars and they dropped to the ground about one-third of the way down the ridge.

Jones decided to bring back his other two squads to form a solid line and, expecting to be gone only a few minutes, he left his SCR-300 radio behind. Jones found one squad but the other had gone on farther and was not visible. While he studied the terrain and waited for a messenger he had sent to bring back that last squad, KPA attacked the main company position behind him. Judging by the noise he heard, Jones thought that KPA had moved in force to the wooded bowl between him and the rest of the company. Jones never got back to his 3rd Squad. He and the rest of the platoon dropped down off the ridge into a gully on the left.

That night Jones and the eight men with him stayed in the ravine just under the crest. Without his radio he could not communicate with the rest of the company which he thought had been destroyed or driven off the hill. The next day when American fighter planes strafed the hilltop it confirmed his belief that no D Company men were there. Some of the men in the advanced squad made their way back to US lines, but the KPA captured Jones and the eight men with him near the bottom of Ka-san on September 10 as they were trying to make their way through the KPA lines. This account of the 3rd Platoon explains why, except for the 3d Squad which rejoined D Company that evening, it was out of the action and off the crest almost as soon as it arrived on top, unknown to Kennedy and the rest of the company at the time.

=== North Koreans hit Hill 755 ===
About 30 minutes after D Company had reached Hill 755, an estimated KPA battalion launched an attack down the slope running south to Hill 755 from the crest of Hill 902. The main attack hit Vandygriff's 2nd Platoon just after Vandygriff had set up and loaded his two machine guns. These machine guns and the protection of the 15 feet (4.6 m) wall on its left enabled D Company to turn back this attack, which left one dead and three wounded in the 2nd Platoon. That night, KPA mortar and small arms fire harassed the company and there were several small probing attacks. Having no communication with the 3rd Platoon, Kennedy sent a patrol to its supposed position. The patrol reported back that it could find no one there but had found the platoon's rocket launchers and two light machine guns.

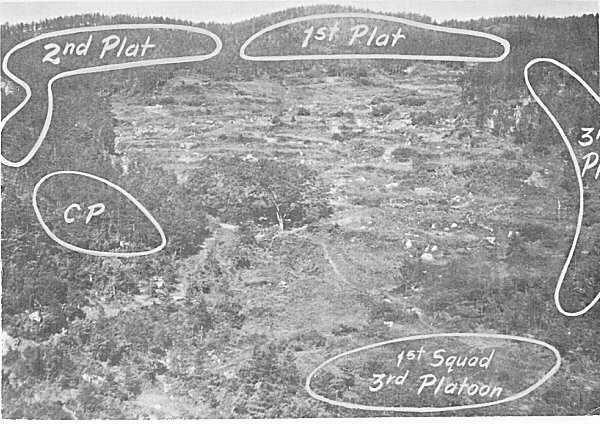
D Company's defensive lines atop Hill 755.

At dawn on September 5 the KPA attacked. The engineers repulsed this attack but suffered some casualties. KPA fire destroyed Vandygriff's radio, forcing him to use runners to communicate with Kennedy's command post. Ammunition was running low and three US C-47 Skytrain aircraft came over the area to make an airdrop. Kennedy put out orange identification panels, but the KPA put out similar panels. The planes circled, and finally dropped their bundles of ammunition and food on the KPA positions. Immediately after the airdrops, two F-51 Mustang fighter planes came over and attacked D Company. The KPA panels had misled both the cargo and fighter planes. The fighters dropped two napalm tanks within D Company's perimeter, but none there were injured. The planes then strafed right through the 2nd Platoon position, but again caused no casualties. Soon after this aerial attack, KPA troops attacked the positions, and PPSh-41 "burp gun" fire wounded Kennedy in the leg and ankle.

Sometime between 10:00 and 11:00 the advanced platoon of E Company, 8th Cavalry Regiment, arrived on top of Hill 755 and came into D Company's perimeter. Some of the engineers fired on the E Company men before the latter identified themselves. The E Company platoon went into position on the right of Vandygriff, and Kennedy turned over command of the combined force to the E Company commander. Kennedy then assembled 12 wounded men and started down the mountain with them. The party was under small arms fire most of the way. A carrying party of Korean A-frame porters led by an American officer had started up the mountain during the morning with supplies. KPA fire, killing several of the porters, turned it back.

The day before, E Company had been delayed in following D Company to Hill 755. Soon after the Engineer company had started up the trail on September 4, E Company arrived at Holley's command post at the base of the mountain. KPA mortar fire was falling on the trail at the time and the company commander said he could not advance because of it. Holley radioed this information to Palmer who designated another company commander. This second officer was soon wounded in the leg and Holley then designated a third officer, who started up the mountain with E Company that evening about 20:00. KPA fire stopped the company 500 yards (460 m) short of the crest before dawn. It was this same company that the KPA 13th Division had cut off when it launched its attack the evening of September 2 and overran the 2nd Battalion north of Tabu-dong. Tired and dispirited from this experience and their roundabout journey to rejoin the regiment, E Company men were suffering from lowered morale.

Shortly after the E Company platoon joined Vandygriff, the KPA attacked again. The E Company infantrymen had brought no mortars with them-only small arms. In this situation, Vandygriff took a 3.5-inch rocket launcher and fired into the KPA attackers, causing them to break off the attack. By now Vandygriff's troops were nearly out of ammunition. He then instructed his men to gather up all the weapons and ammunition from KPA dead they could reach, and in this manner they obtained for emergency use about 30 to 40 rifles, five PPSh-41 guns, and some hand grenades.

In the course of gathering up these weapons, Vandygriff passed the dug-in position of Private First Class Melvin L. Brown, a BAR man in the 3rd Squad. Brown was next to the wall on the extreme left of the platoon position at a point where the wall was only about 6 feet (1.8 m) high. At the bottom of the wall around Brown's position lay 15 to 20 KPA dead. Earlier in the day, about 08:00, Kennedy had visited Brown and had seen five KPA dead that Brown had killed with BAR fire. Subsequently, Brown exhausted his ammunition, then his few grenades, and finally he used his entrenching tool to knock the KPA in the head when they tried to climb over the wall. Brown had been slightly wounded in the shoulder early in the morning, but had bandaged it himself and refused to leave his position.

=== Evacuation of Ka-san ===
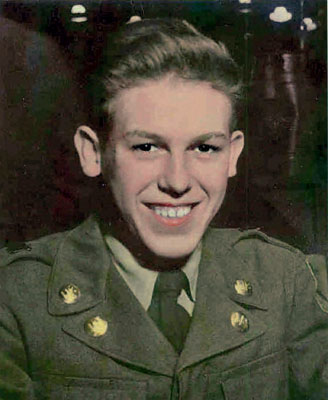
US Private First Class Melvin Brown, killed at Ka-san, who would later receive the Medal of Honor for his actions there

At 13:30 Gay ordered the 8th Cavalry Regiment to withdraw its men off Ka-san. Gay believed he had insufficient forces to secure and hold it and that the KPA had insufficient ammunition to exploit its possession as an observation point for directing artillery and mortar fire. However, Holley could not reach anyone in D Company, 8th Engineer Combat Battalion.

Rain started falling again and heavy fog closed in on the mountain top and severely reduced visibility there. Again the KPA attacked the 2nd Platoon and the adjacent E Company infantrymen. One of the engineers was shot through the neck and Vandygriff sent him to the company command post, only to have the man return to report that there was no longer a command post, that he could not find anyone and had seen only KPA dead. Vandygriff now went to the noncommissioned officer who was in command of the E Company platoon and inform him. The two decided to withdraw.

As Vandygriff and his men began pulling back from the mountain, KPA fire was falling in the platoon area from nearly all directions. The squad leaders started to break up the weapons that the platoon could not take out with them. At this time they discovered Brown was dead. Vandygriff told his troops not to remove the identification tags from the dead they would be leaving behind, as the tags would be the only means of identification later. Vandygriff put his platoon in a V formation and led them off the hill by the same trail they had ascended, picking up four wounded men on the way down.

At the base of the mountain, Holley and others in the afternoon saw E Company men come down from the top and, later, men from the engineer company. Each group thought it was the last of the survivors and told confused, conflicting stories. When all remaining members of D Company had been assembled, Holley found that the company had suffered 50 percent casualties; 18 men were wounded and 30 were missing in action.

=== KPA consolidation ===
Soldiers of the ROKA 1st Division captured a KPA soldier near Ka-san on September 4 who said that about 800 KPA soldiers were on Ka-san with three more battalions following them from the north. The engineer company had succeeded only in establishing a perimeter briefly within the KPA-held area. By evening of September 5, Ka-san was securely in KPA hands with an estimated five battalions, totaling about 1,500 soldiers, on the mountain and its forward slope. A KPA oxtrain carrying 82-mm. mortar shells and rice reportedly reached the top of Ka-san during the day. The ROKA 1st Division captured this oxtrain a few days later south of Ka-san. By September 10, 400-500 KPA were on the ridge of Ka-San, as observed by a T-6 Mosquito spotter plane.

Now, with Ka-san firmly in their possession, the KPA 13th and 1st Divisions made ready to press on downhill into Taegu. On September 6, the day after the US troops were driven off Ka-san, a KPA force established a roadblock 3 miles (4.8 km) below Tabu-dong and other units occupied Hill 570 (36.012°N 128.567°E), 2 miles (3.2 km) southwest of Ka-san and overlooking the Taegu road from the east side. The next morning five tanks of the 16th Reconnaissance Company prepared to lead an attack against the roadblock. The KPA troops were in a rice field west and on the hills east of the road. Gay personally observed the action. The tank attack speedily disposed of the KPA in the rice field, but the US infantry spent several hours clearing the hills on the east side of the road.

KPA artillery during September 7 shelled batteries of the 9th and 99th Field Artillery Battalions, forcing displacement of two batteries during the day. US air strikes and artillery kept both Hills 902 and 570 under heavy attack. Even though the 1st Cavalry Division fell back nearly everywhere that day, Walker ordered it and the ROKA II Corps to attack and seize Hill 902 and Ka-san. He directed the ROKA 1st Division and the US 1st Cavalry Division to select a boundary between them and to maintain physical contact during the attack.

On the morning of September 8, Lieutenant colonel Harold K. Johnson's 3rd Battalion, 8th Cavalry, after a withdrawal during the night from its former position, tried to drive the KPA from Hill 570. The three peaks of this mountain mass were under clouds, making it impossible to support the infantry attack with air strikes or artillery and mortar fire. Johnson placed all three of his companies in the assault against the three peaks; two of them reached their objectives, one with little opposition, the other caught KPA soldiers asleep on the ground. But KPA counterattacks regained this second peak. The main KPA force on Hill 570 was on the third and highest of the three peaks and held it firmly against the L Company attack. The I Company commander and the L Company executive officer were killed, as were several NCOs. An estimated 1,000 KPA soldiers were on Hill 570, 8 miles (13 km) north of Taegu, and on September 8, Walker decided the continued pressure against the eastern flank of the 1st Cavalry Division sector was the most immediate threat to the UN forces at Pusan Perimeter.

That same day, 8 September, the 1st Cavalry Division canceled a planned continuation of the attack against Hill 570 by the 3rd Battalion, 7th Cavalry Regiment, when KPA forces threatened Hills 314 (35.997°N 128.584°E) and 660 (35.989°N 128.603°E), south and east of 570.

=== Taegu threatened ===
In the midst of this drive on Taegu, an ammunition shortage became critical for the UN forces. The situation was such that UN Commander General of the Army Douglas MacArthur on September 9 sent messages urging that two ammunition ships then en route to Yokohama, Japan and Pusan carrying 172,790 rounds of 105-mm. shells, with estimated arrival time September 11, proceed at maximum speed consistent with the safety of the vessels. Eighth Army on September 10 reduced the ration of 105-mm. howitzer ammunition from 50 to 25 rounds per howitzer per day, except in cases of emergency. Carbine ammunition was also in critical short supply. The 17th Field Artillery Battalion, with the first 8-inch howitzers to arrive in Korea, could not engage in the battle for lack of ammunition.

The KPA 1st Division now began moving in the zone of the ROKA 1st Division around the right flank of the 1st Cavalry Division. Its 2nd Regiment, with 1,200 men, advanced 6 miles (9.7 km) eastward from the vicinity of Hill 902 to the towering 4,000-foot-high (1,200 m) mountain of P'algong-san. It reached the top of P'algong-san about daylight on September 10, and a little later new replacements made a charge toward the ROKA positions. The ROKA repulsed the charge, killing or wounding about two-thirds of the attacking force.

The US 1st Cavalry Division now had most of its combat units concentrated on its right flank north of Taegu. The 3rd Battalion, 7th Cavalry, attached to the 8th Cavalry Regiment, was behind that regiment on Hills 181 and 182 astride the Tabu-dong road only 6 miles (9.7 km) north of Taegu. The rest of the 7th Cavalry Regiment (the 1st Battalion rejoined the regiment during the day) was in the valley of the Kumho River to the right rear between the KPA and the Taegu Airfield, which was situated 3 miles (4.8 km) northeast of the city. The US 5th Cavalry Regiment was disposed on the hills astride the Waegwan road 8 miles (13 km) northwest of Taegu. On its left the entire 8th Engineer Combat Battalion was in line as infantry, with the mission of holding a bridge across the Kumho River near its juncture with the Naktong River east of Taegu.

The fighting north of Taegu on September 11 in the vicinity of Hills 660 and 314 was heavy and confused. For a time, the 1st Cavalry Division feared a breakthrough to the blocking position of the 3rd Battalion, 7th Cavalry. The rifle companies of the division were now very low in strength. Johnson stated later that any company of the 3rd Battalion, 8th Cavalry, that had 100 men during this period was his assault company for the day.

=== Hill 314 ===
While the 3rd Battalion, 8th Cavalry, again vainly attacked Hill 570 on September 11, KPA soldiers seized the crest of Hill 314 2 miles (3.2 km) southeast of it and that much closer to Taegu. Actually, the two hill masses are adjacent and their lower slopes within small arms range of each other. The KPA drove the 16th Reconnaissance Company from the hill and only the ROKA 5th Training Battalion, previously hurried into the line from Taegu in a supporting position, prevented the KPA from gaining complete control of this terrain feature. This ROKA battalion still held part of the reverse slope of Hill 314 when the 3rd Battalion, 8th Cavalry, hurried to the scene from its attacks on Hill 570 and tried to retake the position. The ROKA battalion twice had attacked and reached the crest but could not hold it, and had dug in on the lower southern slopes. The 3rd Battalion, 7th Cavalry, command post had to fight off infiltrating KPA on September 12 as it issued its attack order and prepared to attack through the 8th Cavalry lines against Hill 314.

This attack on the 12th was to be part of a larger US and ROK counterattack against the KPA 13th and 1st Divisions in an effort to halt them north of Taegu. The 2nd Battalion, 7th Cavalry, relieved the ROKA units on Hill 660, east of Hill 314, and had the mission of securing that hill. Farther east the ROKA 1st Division had the mission of attacking from P'algong-san toward Ka-san. The point nearest Taegu occupied by KPA forces at this time was Hill 314. The KPA 13th Division valued its possession and had concentrated about 700 soldiers on it. The KPA intended to use Hill 314 in making the next advance on Taegu. From it, observation reached to Taegu and it commanded the lesser hills southward rimming the Taegu bowl. Hill 314 is actually the southern knob of a 500 metres (1,600 ft) hill mass which lies close to the east side of Hill 570 and is separated from that hill mass only by a deep gulch. The southern point rises to 314 metres (1,030 ft) and the ridge line climbs northward from it in a series of knobs. The ridge line is 1 mile (1.6 km) in length, and all sides of the hill mass are very steep.

Lieutenant colonel James H. Lynch's 3rd Battalion, 7th Cavalry, on the eve of its attack against Hill 314 numbered 535 men, less its rear echelons. The battalion had arrived in Korea at the end of August. The action of the 7th Cavalry at Hill 518, begun nine days earlier, had been its first action, and attacking Hill 314 would be its second. The battalion attack plan this time differed radically from that employed against Hill 518 and was a direct development of that failure. The key aspect of the Hill 314 attack plan was to mass as many riflemen as possible on top of the narrow ridge line, by attacking with two companies abreast along the ridge, as opposed to Hill 518, where the firepower of only a platoon, and at times of only a squad, could be brought to bear against the KPA. Because of the ammunition shortage there was no artillery preparation on Hill 314, but there was an air strike before Lynch's battalion, with L Company on the left and I Company on the right started its attack from the lower slopes at 11:00 on September 12.

KPA 120-mm. mortar fire was already falling on battalion as it moved out. For 500 yards (460 m) it encountered only sporadic small arms and machine gun fire; then KPA rifle fire became intense and preregistered mortar fire came down on the troops, slowing the advance. On the left, men in L Company could see approximately 400 KPA preparing to counterattack. They radioed for an air strike but the designated planes were on the ground refueling. The troops were still able to repulse the counterattack with combined artillery, mortar, and small arms fire. The air strike came in at 14:00, blanketing the top and the north slope of the ridge. By this time KPA mortar fire had caused many casualties, and elements of L and I Companies became intermingled. But, in contrast to the action on Hill 518, the men continued the attack largely of their own volition after many of the officers had become casualties. Many of the officers in the companies were wounded but refused evacuation and simply continued the attack. Fifteen minutes after the air strike, the 3rd Battalion resumed its attack toward the crest. As it neared it the KPA came out of their positions in a violent counterattack and engaged at close quarters. Some men gained the crest but KPA mortar and machine gun fire drove them off. They reached it a second time but could not hold it. Another air strike hit the KPA. Then, a third time, the company commander led his men to the top. The men scrambled up a 60-degree slope for the last stretch to the top, where they closed with the KPA and overran their positions. The remaining men of the two US companies secured the hill and then reorganized jointly. There were fewer than 40 effectives left in L Company and about 40 in I Company; the latter had lost all its officers.

Gay caused a special study to be made of this action because he considered it so outstanding. He found that the 3d Battalion suffered 229 battle casualties in the first two hours. Of these, 38 troops were killed and 167 wounded, the remainder were Korean Augmentation To the United States Army. The battalion aid station reported treating 130 casualties. Other wounded were treated at the 8th Cavalry aid station. Many men with minor wounds did not ask for medical attention until the battle had ended, and there were only five cases of combat shock in contrast to the eighteen on Hill 518. KPA mortar fire caused 80 percent of the casualties.

The battalion held Hill 314 for the next six days and gathered up a large amount of KPA equipment and ammunition. The KPA soldiers on Hill 314 wore US uniforms, helmets and combat boots. Many of them had M1 rifles and carbines. About 200 KPA dead were on the hill. Of the other 500 estimated to have been there, most of them had been wounded or were missing. Several war crimes committed by the KPA came to light during the action on Hill 314. On September 12 while the final action on the hill was taking place, troops discovered an American officer who had been bound, gasoline poured over him, and burned. Two days later members of the battalion found on the hill the bodies of four other American soldiers with their hands tied. The bodies bore evidence that the men had been bayoneted and shot while bound.

=== Final moves ===
After the capture of Hill 314 on September 12, the situation north of Taegu improved. On September 14 the 2nd Battalion, 8th Cavalry, attacked and, supported by fire from Hill 314, gained part of Hill 570 from the KPA 19th Regiment, 13th Division.

Across the army boundary on the right, the ROKA 1st Division continued its attack northwest and advanced to the edge of Ka-san. The ROKA 11th Regiment seized Hill 755 about dark on September 14, and small elements of the ROKA 15th Regiment reached the stone ramparts of the Ka-san area at the same time. The ROKA and KPA troops fought during the night and on into the 15th at many points along the high mountain backbone that extends southeast from Ka-san to Hills 755 and 783 and on to P'algong-san. Prisoners taken by the ROKA estimated that there were about 800 KPA on this high ridge. The ROKA 1st Division later estimated that approximately 3,000 KPA were inside Ka-san's walled perimeter and about 1,500 or 2,000 outside it near the crest. At this time the bulk of the KPA 1st Division was gradually withdrawing into Ka-san and its vicinity. Indications were that the KPA 13th Division also was withdrawing northward. Aerial observers on the afternoon of September 14 reported that an estimated 500 KPA troops were moving north from Tabu-dong. While these signs were hopeful, Walker continued to prepare for a final close-in defense of Taegu. As part of this, 14 battalions of South Korean police dug in around the city.

The fighting continued unabated north of Taegu on the 15th. The 2nd Battalion, 8th Cavalry, still fought to gain control of Hill 570 on the east side of the Tabu-dong highway. On the other side, the 2nd Battalion, 8th Cavalry, attacked Hill 401 where a KPA force had penetrated in a gap between the 8th and 5th Cavalry Regiments. The fighting on Hill 401 was particularly severe. Both sides had troops on the mountain when night fell.

=== North Korean withdrawal ===
The UN counterattack at Inchon outflanked the KPA and cut off all their main supply and reinforcement routes. On September 16 Eighth Army began its Breakout from the Pusan Perimeter. On September 19 the UN discovered the KPA had abandoned much of the Pusan Perimeter during the night, and the UN units began advancing out of their defensive positions and occupying them. Most of the KPA units began conducting delaying actions attempting to get as much of their army as possible into North Korea. The KPA withdrew from the Masan area first, the night of September 18–19. After the forces there, the remainder of the KPA withdrew rapidly to the North. The UN units rapidly pursued them north, passing over the Naktong River positions, which were no longer of strategic importance.

== Aftermath ==
The KPA 13th and 1st Divisions were almost completely destroyed in the battles. The 1st Division had numbered 5,000 men at the beginning of the offensive on September 1. The 13th Division numbered 9,000. Only 2,000 men from the 1st Division were able to retreat back into North Korea by October. The majority of the division's troops had been killed, captured or deserted. The KPA 13th Division, however, was completely annihilated. Only a few isolated pockets of its men were known to have made it back to North Korea. Most of the division's officers, including its artillery commander, division surgeon, the chief of staff, and two of the three regimental commanders. When the KPA 19th Regiment surrendered in Tanyang, it had only 167 men. No more than a few hundred of the original 9,000 returned to North Korea. All of KPA II Corps was in a similar state, and the KPA was on the brink of defeat.

By this time, the US 1st Cavalry Division suffered 770 killed, 2,613 wounded, 62 captured during its time at Pusan Perimeter. This included about 600 casualties, with around 200 killed in action it had already suffered during the Battle of Taegu the previous month. American forces were continually repulsed but able to prevent the KPA from breaking the Pusan Perimeter. The division had numbered 14,703 on September 1, but was in excellent position to attack despite its casualties. ROKA casualties at the battle were difficult to predict, but also thought to be heavy. The ROKA 1st Division had numbered 10,482 men September 1.
