= Battle of Tabu-dong =

Part of the Korean War

- Part of the Battle of Pusan Perimeter
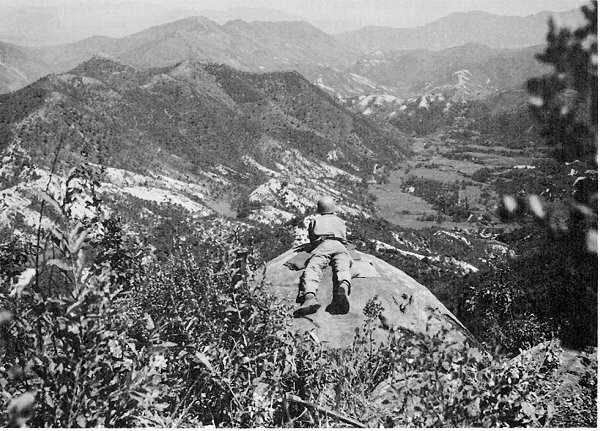
- US 1st Cavalry Division troops look down on Hill 518 from an observation post north of Waegwan, September 1950.
Date	September 1–15, 1950
Location	Tabu-dong, Gasan-myeon, Chilgok County, South Korea 36.047433°N 128.517380°E
Result	United Nations victory

Belligerents
United Nations: United States; South Korea	North Korea

Commanders and leaders
(United States) Hobart R. Gay (First Republic of Korea) Paik Sun-yup (First Republic of Korea) Kim Chŏm-gon	Lee Yong Ho

Units involved
(United States) 1st Cavalry Division (First Republic of Korea) 1st Infantry Division	3rd Division

Strength
14,703	7,000

Casualties and losses
600 killed 2,000 wounded	5,000 killed, captured and deserted

The Battle of Tabu-dong was an engagement between United Nations Command (UN) and North Korean forces early in the Korean War from September 1 to September 15, 1950, in the vicinity of Tabu-dong, Chilgok County, north of Taegu in South Korea. It was a part of the Battle of Pusan Perimeter, and was one of several large engagements fought simultaneously. The battle ended in a victory for the UN after large numbers of United States Army (US) and Republic of Korea Army (ROKA) troops repelled a strong Korean People's Army (KPA) attack.

Holding positions north of the crucial city of Taegu, the US 1st Cavalry Division stood at the center and the ROKA 1st Division held at the northwest of the Pusan Perimeter defensive line, tasked with keeping the UN headquarters secured from attacks from the KPA. On September 1, the KPA 3rd Division attacked as part of the Great Naktong Offensive.

What followed was a two-week battle around Tabu-dong and Waegwan in which the KPA were able to gradually push the 1st Cavalry Division back from its lines. However, the KPA were not able to force the US and ROKA troops to withdraw completely or push the UN out of Taegu. The KPA was outflanked by the Inchon landings on 15 September and on 16 September the UN forces began their breakout from the Pusan Perimeter, forcing the KPA to abandon their attacks on Tabu-dong.

== Background ==
=== Pusan Perimeter ===
From the outbreak of the Korean War and the invasion of South Korea by the North, the KPA had enjoyed superiority in both manpower and equipment over both the ROKA and the UN forces dispatched to South Korea to prevent it from collapsing. The KPA strategy was to aggressively pursue UN forces on all avenues of approach south and to engage them aggressively, attacking from the front and initiating a double envelopment of both flanks of the unit, which allowed the KPA to surround and cut off the opposing force, which would then be forced to retreat in disarray, often leaving behind much of its equipment. From their initial June 25 offensive to fights in July and early August, the KPA used this strategy to effectively defeat any UN force and push it south. However, when the UN forces, under the Eighth United States Army, established the Pusan Perimeter in August, the UN troops held a continuous line along the peninsula which KPA troops could not flank, and their advantages in numbers decreased daily as the superior UN logistical system brought in more troops and supplies to the UN forces.

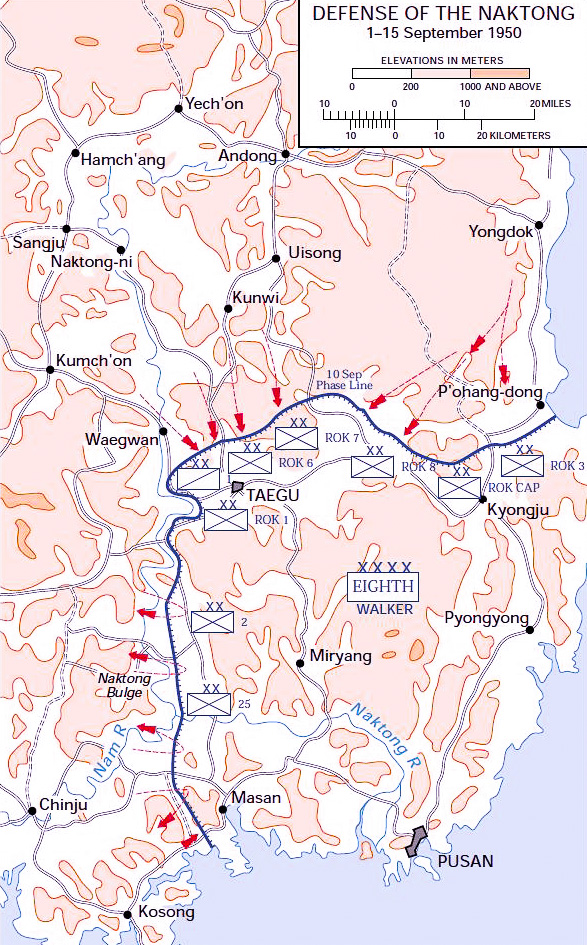
Map of the Pusan Perimeter Defensive line in September 1950 the Kyongju corridor is the northeasternmost sector

When the KPA approached the Pusan Perimeter on August 5, they attempted the same frontal assault technique on the four main avenues of approach into the perimeter. Throughout August, the KPA 6th Division, and later the KPA 7th Division engaged the US 25th Infantry Division at the Battle of Masan, initially repelling a UN counteroffensive before countering with battles at Komam-ni and Battle Mountain. These attacks stalled as UN forces, well equipped and with plenty of reserves, repeatedly repelled KPA attacks. North of Masan, the KPA 4th Division and the US 24th Infantry Division sparred in the Naktong Bulge area. In the First Battle of Naktong Bulge, the KPA division was unable to hold its bridgehead across the river as large numbers of US reserve forces were brought in to repel it, and on August 19, the KPA 4th Division was forced back across the river with 50 percent casualties. In the Taegu region, five KPA divisions were repulsed by three UN divisions in several attempts to attack the city during the Battle of Taegu. Particularly heavy fighting took place at the Battle of the Bowling Alley where the KPA 13th Division was almost completely destroyed in the attack. On the east coast, three more KPA divisions were repulsed by the ROKA at P'ohang-dong during the Battle of P'ohang-dong. All along the front, the KPA troops were reeling from these defeats, the first time in the war their strategies were not working.

=== September push ===
In planning its new offensive, the KPA command decided any attempt to flank the UN force was impossible due to the support of the UN naval forces. Instead, they opted to use frontal attack to breach the perimeter and collapse it as the only hope of achieving success in the battle. Fed by intelligence from the Soviet Union the KPA were aware the UN forces were building up along the Pusan Perimeter and that it must conduct an offensive soon or it could not win the battle. A secondary objective was to surround Taegu and destroy the UN forces in that city. As part of this mission, the KPA would first cut the supply lines to Taegu.

On August 20, the KPA commands distributed operations orders to their subordinate units. The plan called for a simultaneous five-prong attack against the UN lines. These attacks would overwhelm the UN defenders and allow the KPA to break through the lines in at least one place to force the UN forces back. Five battle groupings were ordered. The center attack called for the KPA 3rd, 13th and 1st Divisions to break through the US 1st Cavalry Division and ROKA 1st Division to Taegu.

== Battle ==
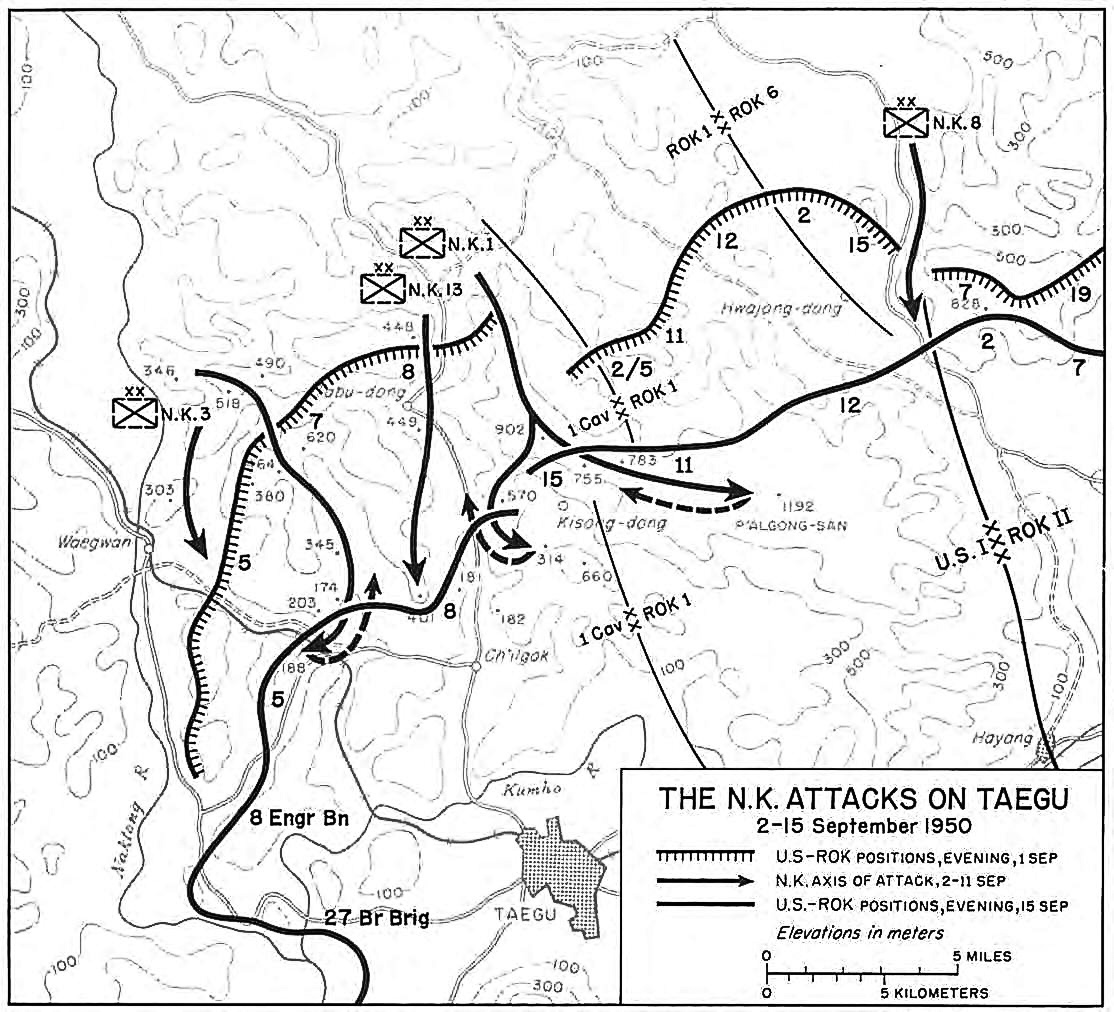
North Korean attacks on Taegu, September 1950.

While four divisions of the KPA II Corps attacked south in the P'ohang-dong, Kyongju and Yongch'on area, the remaining three divisions of the corps-the 3rd, 13th and 1st conducted their converging attack on Taegu from the north and northwest. The KPA 3rd Division was to attack in the Waegwan area northwest of Taegu, the KPA 13th Division down the mountain ridges north of Taegu along and west of the Sangju-Taegu road, and the KPA 1st Division along the high mountain ridges just east of the road.

Defending Taegu, the US 1st Cavalry Division had a front of about 35 miles (56 km). Division Commander Major general Hobart R. Gay outposted the main avenues of entry into his zone and kept his three regiments concentrated behind the outposts. At the southwestern end of his line Gay initially controlled the US 3rd Battalion, 23rd Infantry Regiment, 2nd Infantry Division, which had been attached to the 1st Cavalry Division. On September 5 the British 27th Commonwealth Brigade, in its first commitment in the Korean War, replaced that battalion. Next in line northward, the US 5th Cavalry Regiment defended the sector along the Naktong around Waegwan and the main Seoul highway southeast from there to Taegu. Eastward, the US 7th Cavalry Regiment was responsible for the mountainous area between that highway and the hills bordering the Sangju road. The US 8th Cavalry Regiment, responsible for the latter road, was astride it and on the bordering hills.

=== Hill 518 ===
Eighth United States Army commander Lieutenant general Walton Walker ordered the 1st Cavalry Division to attack north on September 1 in an effort to divert some of the KPA strength from the US 2nd and 25th Infantry Divisions in the south. Gay's initial decision upon receipt of this order was to attack north up the Sangju road, but his staff and regimental commanders all joined in urging that the attack instead be against Hill 518 (36.058°N 128.44°E) in the 7th Cavalry zone. Only two days before, Hill 518 had been in the ROKA 1st Division zone and had been considered a KPA assembly point. The 1st Cavalry Division, accordingly, prepared for an attack in the 7th Cavalry sector and for diversionary attacks by two companies of the 3rd Battalion, 8th Cavalry, on the 7th Cavalry's right flank. This left the 8th Cavalry only one infantry company in reserve. The regiment's 1st Battalion was on the hill mass to the west of the Bowling Alley and north of Tabu-dong; its 2nd Battalion was astride the road.

This planned attack against Hill 518 coincided with the defection of KPA Major Kim Song Jun of the 19th Regiment, 13th Division. He reported that a full-scale KPA attack was to begin at dusk that day. The 13th Division, he said, had just taken in 4,000 replacements, 2,000 of them without weapons, and was now back to a strength of approximately 9,000 men. Upon receiving this intelligence, Gay alerted all front-line units to be prepared for the attack. The ROKA 1st Division under command of Brigadier general Paik Sun Yup also braced his men for attack.

Complying with Eighth Army's order for a spoiling attack against the KPA northwest of Taegu, Gay ordered the 7th Cavalry to attack on September 2 and seize Hill 518. Hill 518, also called Suam-san, is a large mountain mass 5 miles (8.0 km) northeast of Waegwan and 2 miles (3.2 km) east of the Naktong River. It curves westward from its peak to its westernmost height, Hill 346, from which the ground drops abruptly to the Naktong River. Situated north of the lateral Waegwan-Tabu–dong road, and about midway between the two towns, it was a critical terrain feature dominating the road between the two places. After securing Hill 518, the 7th Cavalry attack was to continue on to Hill 314 (36.061°N 128.416°E). Air strikes and artillery preparations were to precede the infantry attack.

On the morning of September 2 the US Air Force (USAF) delivered a 37-minute strike against Hills 518 and 346. The artillery then laid down its concentrations on the hills, and after that the planes came over again with napalm, leaving the heights on fire. Just after 10:00, and immediately after the final napalm strike, the 1st Battalion, 7th Cavalry, attacked up Hill 518. The heavy air strikes and the artillery preparations had failed to dislodge the KPA. From their positions they delivered mortar and machine gun fire on the climbing infantry, stopping the weak, advanced US force short of the crest. In the afternoon the US battalion withdrew from Hill 518 and attacked northeast against Hill 490, from which other KPA troops had fired in support of the KPA on Hill 518.

The next day at 12:00, the newly arrived 3rd Battalion resumed the attack against Hill 518 from the south, as did the 1st Battalion the day before, in a column of companies that resolved itself in the end into a column of squads. Again the attack failed. Other attacks failed on September 4. A KPA forward observer captured on Hill 518 said that 1,200 KPA were dug in on the hill and that they had large numbers of mortars and ammunition to hold out.

=== North Korean flanking moves ===
While these attacks were in progress on its right, the 2nd Battalion, 5th Cavalry Regiment, on September 4 attacked and captured Hill 303. The next day it had difficulty in holding the hill against counterattacks. By September 4 it had become clear that the KPA 3rd Division in front of the 5th and 7th Cavalry Regiments was also attacking, and despite continued air strikes, artillery preparations and infantry efforts on Hill 518, it was infiltrating large numbers of its troops to the rear of the attacking US forces. That night large KPA forces came through the gap between the 3rd Battalion on the southern slope of Hill 518 and the 2nd Battalion westward. The KPA turned west and occupied Hill 464 (36.028°N 128.456°E) in force. By September 5, Hill 464 to the rear of the 7th Cavalry had more KPA on it than Hill 518 to its front. KPA cut the Waegwan to Tabu-dong road east of the regiment so that its communications with other US units now were only to the west. During the day the 7th Cavalry made a limited withdrawal on Hill 518, giving up on capturing the hill.

On the division right, Tabu-dong was in KPA hands, on the left Waegwan was a no-man's land, and in the center strong KPA forces were infiltrating southward from Hill 518. The 7th Cavalry Regiment in the center could no longer use the Waegwan-Tabu-dong lateral supply road behind it, and was in danger of being surrounded. After discussing a withdrawal plan with Walker, Gay on September 5 issued an order for a general withdrawal of the 1st Cavalry Division during the night to shorten the lines and to occupy a better defensive position. The movement was to progress from right to left beginning with the 8th Cavalry Regiment, then the 7th Cavalry in the Hill 518 area, and finally the 5th Cavalry in the Waegwan area. This withdrawal caused the 3rd Battalion, 8th Cavalry, to give up a hill it had just attacked and captured near the Tabu-dong road on the approaches of the Walled City of Ka-san. In the 7th Cavalry sector the 1st, 3rd, and 2nd Battalions were to withdraw in that order, after the withdrawal of the 1st Battalion, 8th Cavalry, on their right. The 2nd Battalion, 5th Cavalry, on Hill 303 north of Waegwan was to cover the withdrawal of the 7th Cavalry and hold open the escape road.

=== Further US withdrawal ===
In his withdrawal instructions for the 7th Cavalry, Colonel Cecil Nist, the regimental commander, ordered the 2nd Battalion to disengage from the KPA to its front and attack to its rear to gain possession of Hills 464 and 380 on the new Main line of resistance to be occupied by the regiment. Efforts to gain possession of Hill 464 by other elements had failed in the past several days.

Heavy rains fell during the night of September 5–6 and mud slowed all wheeled and tracked vehicles in the withdrawal. The 1st Battalion completed its withdrawal without opposition. During its night march west, the 3rd Battalion column was joined several times by groups of KPA soldiers who apparently thought it was one of their own columns moving south. They were made prisoners and taken along in the withdrawal. Nearing Waegwan at dawn, the battalion column was taken under KPA mortar and T-34 tank fire after daybreak and sustained 18 casualties.

The 2nd Battalion disengaged from the KPA and began its withdrawal at 03:00, September 6. The battalion abandoned two of its own tanks, one because of mechanical failure and the other because it was stuck in the mud. The battalion moved to the rear in two main groups: G Company to attack Hill 464 and the rest of the battalion to seize Hill 380, farther south. The KPA quickly discovered that the 2nd Battalion was withdrawing and attacked it. The battalion commander, Major Omar T. Hitchner, and his operations officer, Captain James T. Milam, were killed. In the vicinity of Hills 464 and 380 the battalion discovered at daybreak that it was virtually surrounded by KPA. Nist thought that the entire battalion was lost.

Moving by itself and completely cut off from all other units, G Company, numbering only about 80 men, was hardest hit. At 08:00, nearing the top of Hill 464, it surprised and killed three KPA soldiers. Soon after, KPA automatic weapons and small arms fire struck the company. All day G Company maneuvered around the hill but never gained its crest. At mid-afternoon it received radio orders to withdraw that night. The company left six dead on the hill and, carrying its wounded on improvised litters of ponchos and tree branches, it started down the shale slopes of the mountain in rain and darkness. Halfway down, friendly fire injured Captain Herman L. West, the G Company commander. The company scattered but West reassembled it. Cautioning his men to move quietly and not to fire their weapons, West led his men to the eastern base of Hill 464 where he went into a defensive position for the rest of the night.

=== South flank ===
On the division left, meanwhile, the 2nd Battalion, 5th Cavalry, on Hill 303 came under heavy attack and the battalion commander wanted to withdraw. The regimental commander, told him he could not do so until the 7th Cavalry had cleared on its withdrawal road. This battalion suffered heavy casualties before it abandoned Hill 303 on the September 6 to the KPA.

While G Company was trying to escape from Hill 464, the rest of the 2nd Battalion was cut off at the eastern base of Hill 380, to the south. Nist organized all the South Korean carriers he could find before dark and loaded them with water, food, and ammunition for the 2nd Battalion, but the carrier party was unable to find the battalion. At dawn on September 7 the men in G Company was discovered and attacked by KPA troops in nearby positions. At this time, West heard what he recognized as fire from American weapons on a knob to his west. There, G Company was reunited with its Weapons Platoon which had become separated from him during the night.

The Weapons Platoon, after becoming separated from the rest of the company, encountered KPA on the trail it was following three times in the night, but in each instance neither side fired, each going on its way. At dawn, the platoon ambushed a group of KPA, killing 13 and capturing three. From the body of a KPA officer the men took a briefcase containing important documents and maps. These showed that Hill 464 was an assembly point for part of the KPA 3rd Division in its advance from Hill 518 toward Taegu.

Later in the day on September 7, Captain Melbourne C. Chandler, acting commander of the 2nd Battalion, received word of G Company's location on Hill 464 from an aerial observer and sent a patrol which guided the company safely to the battalion at the eastern base of Hill 380. The battalion, meanwhile, had received radio orders to withdraw by any route as soon as possible. It moved southwest into the 5th Cavalry sector.

=== North Korean advance ===
East of the 2nd Battalion, the KPA attacked the 1st Battalion in its new position on September 7 and overran the battalion aid station, killing four and wounding seven men. That night the 1st Battalion on division orders was attached to the 5th Cavalry Regiment. The rest of the 7th Cavalry Regiment moved to a point near Taegu in division reserve. During the night of September 7–8 the 5th Cavalry Regiment on division orders withdrew still farther below Waegwan to new defensive positions astride the main Seoul-Taegu highway. The KPA 3rd Division was still moving reinforcements across the Naktong. Observers sighted barges loaded with troops and artillery pieces crossing the river 2 miles (3.2 km) north of Waegwan on the evening of the 7th. On the 8th a North Korean communiqué claimed the capture of Waegwan.

The next day the situation grew worse for the 1st Cavalry Division. On its left flank, the KPA 3rd Division forced the 1st Battalion, 5th Cavalry, to withdraw from Hill 345, 3 miles (4.8 km) east of Waegwan. The KPA pressed forward and the 5th Cavalry was immediately locked in hard, seesaw fighting on Hills 203 and 174. The 1st Battalion, 7th Cavalry, before it left that sector to rejoin its regiment, finally captured the latter hill after four attacks.

Only with difficulty did the 5th Cavalry Regiment hold Hill 203 on September 12. Between midnight and 04:00 on September 13, the KPA attacked again and took Hill 203 from E Company, Hill 174 from L Company, and Hill 188 from B and F Companies. In an afternoon counterattack the regiment regained Hill 188 on the south side of the highway, but failed against Hills 203 and 174 on the north side. On the 14th, I Company again attacked Hill 174, which had by now changed hands seven times. In this action the company suffered 82 casualties. Even so, the company held only one side of the hill, the KPA held the other, and grenade battles between the two continued for another week. The battalions of the 5th Cavalry Regiment were so low in strength at this time that they were not considered combat effective. This seesaw battle continued in full 8 miles (13 km) northwest of Taegu.

=== North Korean withdrawal ===
The UN counterattack at Inchon on September 15 outflanked the KPA and cut off all their main supply and reinforcement routes. On September 16 Eighth Army began its Breakout from the Pusan Perimeter. On September 19 the UN discovered the KPA had abandoned much of the Pusan Perimeter during the night, and the UN units began advancing out of their defensive positions and occupying them. Most of the KPA units began conducting delaying actions attempting to get as much of their army as possible into North Korea. The KPA withdrew from the Masan area first, the night of September 18–19. After the forces there, the remainder of the KPA withdrew rapidly to the North. UN units rapidly pursued them north, passing over the Naktong River positions, which were no longer of strategic importance.

== Aftermath ==
The KPA 3rd Division was almost completely destroyed in the battles. The division had numbered 7,000 men at the beginning of the offensive on September 1. Only 1,000 to 1,800 men from the division were able to retreat back into North Korea by October. The majority of the division's troops had been killed, captured or deserted. All of KPA II Corps was in a similar state, and the KPA, exhausted at Pusan Perimeter and cut off after Inchon, was on the brink of defeat.

By this time, the US 1st Cavalry Division suffered 770 killed, 2,613 wounded, 62 captured during its time at Pusan Perimeter. This included about 600 casualties, with around 200 killed in action it had already suffered during the Battle of Taegu the previous month. US forces were continually repulsed but able to prevent the KPA from breaking the Pusan Perimeter. The division had numbered 14,703 on September 1, but was in excellent position to attack despite its casualties. ROKA casualties at the battle were difficult to predict, but also thought to be heavy.

Sgt. John Raymond Rice, a Ho Chunk Indian awarded the Bronze Star in World War II, was killed at Tabu-dong on September 6, 1950 leading a squad of Company A, 8th Cavalry Regiment. When his remains were returned for burial in Sioux City, Iowa the public cemetery denied him a burial because of his race. President Truman personally intervened, and arranged for his burial with full military honors at Arlington National Cemetery. A subsequent U.S. Supreme Court case determined in 1954 that racial segregation at public cemeteries was legal.
