= Gordon M. Craig =

United States Army Medal of Honor recipient (1929–1950)

Gordon Maynard Craig
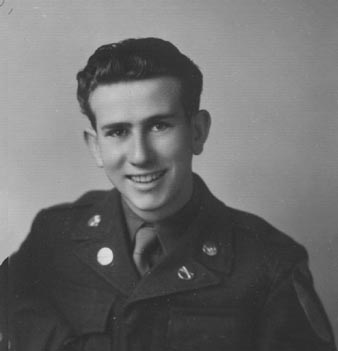
- Medal of Honor recipient Gordon Craig
- Born: August 1, 1929; Brockton, Massachusetts
- Died: September 10, 1950 (aged 21) near Ka-san, Pusan Perimeter, Korea
- Burial place: Elmwood Cemetery, East Bridgewater, Massachusetts
- Military career
- Allegiance: United States of America
- Branch: United States Army
- Service years: 1950
- Rank: Corporal
- Units: 16th Reconnaissance Company, 1st Cavalry Division
- Conflicts: Korean War: Battle of Pusan Perimeter; Battle of Ka-san †
- Awards: Medal of Honor; Purple Heart

Gordon Maynard Craig (August 1, 1929 – September 10, 1950) was a soldier in the United States Army during the Korean War. He posthumously received the Medal of Honor for his actions on September 10, 1950, during the Battle of Ka-san.

Craig earned his Medal of Honor by jumping on a North Korean grenade as his squadmates helped to ambush a North Korean hill, buying them valuable time and sacrificing himself in the process.

== Medal of Honor citation ==
Rank and organization: Corporal, U.S. Army, 16th Reconnaissance Company, 1st Cavalry Division

Place and date: Near Kasan, Korea September 10, 1950

Entered service at: Brockton, Mass. Born: August 1, 1929, Brockton, Mass.

G.O. No.: 23, April 25, 1951.

Citation:

Cpl. Craig, 16th Reconnaissance Company, distinguished himself by conspicuous gallantry and intrepidity above and beyond the call of duty in action against the enemy. During the attack on a strategic enemy-held hill his company's advance was subjected to intense hostile grenade, mortar and small-arms fire. Cpl. Craig and 4 comrades moved forward to eliminate an enemy machine gun nest that was hampering the company's advance. At that instance an enemy machine gunner hurled a hand grenade at the advancing men. Without hesitating or attempting to seek cover for himself, Cpl. Craig threw himself on the grenade and smothered its burst with his body. His intrepid and selfless act, in which he unhesitantly gave his life for his comrades, inspired them to attack with such ferocity that they annihilated the enemy machine gun crew, enabling the company to continue its attack. Cpl. Craig's noble self-sacrifice reflects the highest credit upon himself and upholds the esteemed traditions of the military service.

== Awards and decorations ==

`

Badge	Combat Infantryman Badge		
1st row	Medal of Honor		
2nd row	Purple Heart	Army Good Conduct Medal	National Defense Service Medal
3rd row	Korean Service Medal with 2 Campaign stars	United Nations Service Medal Korea	Korean War Service Medal
Unit awards	Presidential Unit Citation		Korean Presidential Unit Citation

== See also ==
- List of Medal of Honor recipients
- List of Korean War Medal of Honor recipients
