= Mike C. Pena =

United States Army Medal of Honor recipient

Mike Castaneda Pena
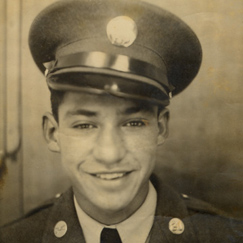
- Born: November 6, 1924; Corpus Christi, Texas
- Died: September 5, 1950 (aged 25); Waegwan, Korea
- Burial place: Cedarvale Cemetery, Bay City, TX
- Military career
- Allegiance: United States of America
- Branch: United States Army
- Service years: 1941–1950
- Rank: Master Sergeant
- Units: 2nd Battalion, 5th Cavalry Regiment, 1st Cavalry Division
- Conflicts: World War II; Korean War: Battle of Pusan Perimeter; Battle of Tabu-dong †
- Awards: Medal of Honor; Bronze Star Medal; Purple Heart (3)

Mike Castaneda Pena (November 6, 1924 – September 5, 1950) was a U.S. Army veteran of World War II and the Korean War, and a recipient of the Medal of Honor for his actions at the Battle of Tabu-dong.

== Biographical details ==
Pena was born in Corpus Christi, Texas on November 6, 1924, into a Mexican American family. He joined the U. S. Army as an infantryman in 1941 when he was 16 years old. He served in both World War II and the Korean War.

== Medal of Honor ==
The bestowal of the Medal recognized Pena's actions on the evening of Sept. 4, 1950, near Waegwan, Korea during the Battle of Tabu-dong, when his unit was fiercely attacked. During the course of the counter-attack, Pena realized that their ammunition was running out, and ordered his unit to retreat. Pena then manned a machine-gun to cover their withdrawal and single-handedly held back the enemy until morning when his position was overrun and he was killed.

Pena received the Medal of Honor posthumously in 2014.

Pena's son Michael David Pena accepted the Medal of Honor for his father, from President Obama in a White House ceremony on March 18, 2014.

The award came through the Defense Authorization Act which called for a review of Jewish American and Hispanic American veterans from World War II, the Korean War and the Vietnam War to ensure that no prejudice was shown to those deserving the Medal of Honor.

== Medal of Honor citation ==

The President of the United States of America, authorized by Act of Congress, July 9, 1918 (amended by act of July 25, 1963), takes pride in presenting the Medal of Honor (posthumously) to:

MIKE C. PENA
United States Army

For conspicuous gallantry and intrepidity at the risk of his life above and beyond the call of duty:

Master Sergeant Mike C. Pena distinguished himself by acts of gallantry and intrepidity above and beyond the call of duty while serving as a member of Company F, 5th Cavalry Regiment, 1st Cavalry Division during combat operations against an armed enemy in Waegwan, Korea, on September 4, 1950.

That evening, under cover of darkness and a dreary mist, an enemy battalion moved to within a few yards of Master Sergeant Pena's platoon. Recognizing the enemy's approach, Master Sergeant Pena and his men opened fire, but the enemy's sudden emergence and accurate, point blank fire forced the friendly troops to withdraw. Master Sergeant Pena rapidly reorganized his men and led them in a counterattack which succeeded in regaining the positions they had just lost. He and his men quickly established a defensive perimeter and laid down devastating fire, but enemy troops continued to hurl themselves at the defenses in overwhelming numbers. Realizing that their scarce supply of ammunition would soon make their positions untenable, Master Sergeant Pena ordered his men to fall back and manned a machinegun to cover their withdrawal. He singlehandedly held back the enemy until the early hours of the following morning when his position was overrun and he was killed.

Master Sergeant Pena's extraordinary heroism and selflessness at the cost of his own life, above and beyond the call of duty, are in keeping with the highest traditions of military service and reflect great credit upon himself, his unit and the United States Army.

== Honors and awards ==
In addition to receiving the Medal of Honor, Pena received the following awards for his service:

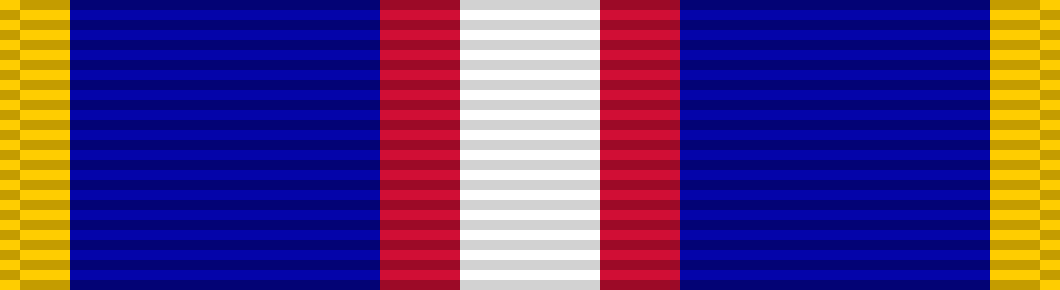

Badge	Combat Infantryman Badge with star denoting 2nd award		
1st row	Medal of Honor Upgraded from DSC, 2014	Bronze Star Medal Retroactively Awarded, 1947	Purple Heart with 2 Oak leaf clusters
2nd row	Army Good Conduct Medal with 2 Good Conduct Loops	American Defense Service Medal	American Campaign Medal
3rd row	Asiatic-Pacific Campaign Medal with Arrowhead Device and 4 Campaign stars	World War II Victory Medal	Army of Occupation Medal with 'Japan' clasp
4th row	National Defense Service Medal	Korean Service Medal with 1 Campaign star	Philippine Liberation Medal with 1 Campaign star
5th row	Philippine Independence Medal	United Nations Service Medal Korea	Korean War Service Medal Retroactively Awarded, 2003
Unit awards	Presidential Unit Citation	Philippine Presidential Unit Citation	Korean Presidential Unit Citation

1st Cavalry Division Insignia

== See also ==
- List of Korean War Medal of Honor recipients
