= Melvin L. Brown =

American Army soldier

Melvin Louis Brown
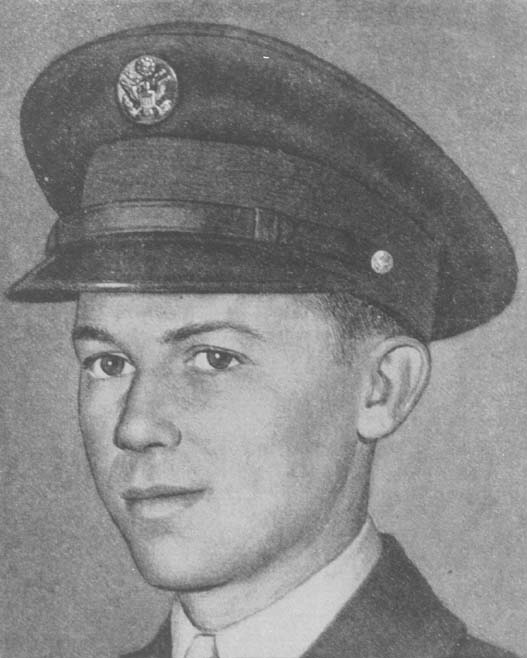
- Private First Class Melvin Brown
- Born: February 22, 1931; Mahaffey, Pennsylvania
- Died: September 5, 1950 (aged 19); Ka-san, Pusan Perimeter, Korea
- Burial place: Mahaffey Cemetery, Mahaffey, Pennsylvania
- Military career
- Allegiance: United States of America
- Branch: United States Army
- Service years: 1948–1950
- Rank: Private First Class
- Units: Company D, 8th Engineer Combat Battalion
- Conflicts: Korean War: Battle of Pusan Perimeter; Battle of Ka-san (MIA)
- Awards: Medal of Honor; Purple Heart

Melvin Louis Brown (February 2, 1931 – September 5, 1950) was a United States Army soldier during the Korean War. He posthumously received the Medal of Honor for his actions on September 4, 1950, during the Battle of Ka-san. He was 19 years old.

== Biography ==
Born and raised in Mahaffey, Pennsylvania, Brown was one of ten children of Edward D. and Rhoda V. Jones Brown. He enjoyed skiing, ice skating, swimming, and fishing. He worked as a mechanic before dropping out of high school and enlisting in the Army at age seventeen in October 1948. He was inspired by his older brother Donald, who had joined the military earlier and was stationed in Japan; two other Brown brothers would also serve in the military. Melvin Brown was sent to Japan, where he stayed for eighteen months until late July 1950 when he was deployed to Korea in the first weeks of the war there.

While in Korea, Brown served as a private first class in Company D of the 8th Engineer Combat Battalion. On September 4, 1950, near Kasan, his platoon was taking a hill when they came under enemy attack. Brown took up a position near a wall and, although he was wounded and eventually ran out of ammunition, maintained his position throughout the battle. The attack was successfully held off, but Brown was declared missing in action the next day.

His family received a telegram in October stating that he was missing. On January 6, 1951, four months after the battle, an Army representative arrived at his parents' home and informed them that he had been declared dead. His parents and some of his siblings attended a Medal of Honor ceremony at the White House later that month. President Harry Truman presented Brown's family with his Medal of Honor.

He was buried in Mahaffey Cemetery within sight of his childhood home.

Several locations have been named in his honor, including a Korean War Memorial Park in Fort Hood, Texas, a parade ground at Camp Howze, South Korea, and a building at the Army's Engineer School in Fort Leonard Wood, Missouri. The Veterans of Foreign Wars post in Mahaffey and an Army Reserve Center in Clearfield, Pennsylvania, are also named in his honor. On February 26, 2008, the Army opened a new 26,000-square-foot (2,400 m^{2}) vehicle maintenance facility named after Brown in Camp Carroll, South Korea. Brown was chosen as the namesake of the facility because he was an engineer and because Camp Carroll is not far from the hill where he earned the Medal of Honor and was killed. The ribbon cutting ceremony was attended by his sister, Sylvia Brown Rich. The explosives' demolition range at Fort Benning, Georgia is also named in his honor. In the 1980s, Fort Benning's Post Engineer department provided ongoing training to various schools such as the Ranger training brigade, infantry officer schools, The School of Americas and even ROTC.

The town of Mahaffey celebrated the first "Pfc. Melvin L. Brown Day" on June 21, 2008. A bridge over the West Branch Susquehanna River was renamed "PFC Melvin L. Brown Memorial Bridge" and a monument to Brown in front of the Community Volunteer Fire Company hall was dedicated on that day. The second annual Melvin Brown Day was held in June 2009.

== Medal of Honor citation ==
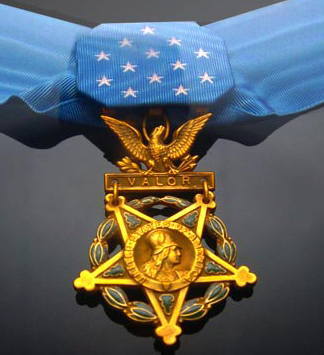

Melvin L. Brown
Rank and organization: Private First Class, U.S. Army, Company D, 8th Engineer Combat Battalion
Place and date: Near Kasan, Korea, September 4, 1950
Entered service at: Erie, Pennsylvania
Born: February 22, 1931 Mahaffey, Pennsylvania
G.O. No.: 11, February 16, 1951.

Citation

Pfc. Brown, Company D distinguished himself by conspicuous gallantry and intrepidity above and beyond the call of duty in action against the enemy. While his platoon was securing Hill 755 (the Walled City), the enemy, using heavy automatic weapons and small arms, counterattacked. Taking a position on a 50-foot (15 m)-high wall he delivered heavy rifle fire on the enemy. His ammunition was soon expended and although wounded, he remained at his post and threw his few grenades into the attackers causing many casualties. When his supply of grenades was exhausted his comrades from nearby foxholes tossed others to him and he left his position, braving a hail of fire, to retrieve and throw them at the enemy. The attackers continued to assault his position and Pfc. Brown[,] weaponless, drew his entrenching tool from his pack and calmly waited until they 1 by 1 peered over the wall, delivering each a crushing blow upon the head. Knocking 10 or 12 enemy from the wall, his daring action so inspired his platoon that they repelled the attack and held their position. Pfc. Brown's extraordinary heroism, gallantry, and intrepidity reflect the highest credit upon himself and was in keeping with the honored traditions of the military service. Reportedly missing in action and officially killed in action, September 5, 1950.

== Awards and decorations ==
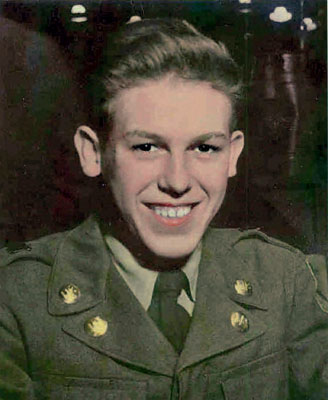
Melvin Brown

Brown's awards include the following:

1st row	Medal of Honor		Purple Heart
2nd row	Army Good Conduct Medal	Army of Occupation Medal	National Defense Service Medal
3rd row	Korean Service Medal with 1 Campaign star	United Nations Service Medal Korea	Korean War Service Medal
Unit awards	Korean Presidential Unit Citation		

== See also ==
- List of Korean War Medal of Honor recipients
