= Gasan (mountain) =

Mountain in South Korea

Coordinates: 36°02′N 128°35′E

Highest point
- Elevation: 901.6 m (2,958 ft)

Geography
- Location: South Korea

Korean name
- Hangul: 가산
- Hanja: 架山
- RR: Gasan
- MR: Kasan

Gasan (Korean: 가산) is a mountain of South Korea (경북). It has an elevation of 901.6 metres

== See also ==
- List of mountains of Korea
