= 8th Engineer Battalion (United States) =

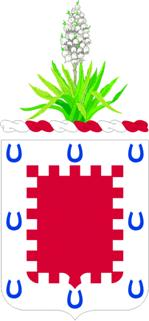
- Coat of arms of the 8th Engineer Battalion
- Active: 1916–2005; 2007–present
- Country: United States
- Branch: United States Army
- Type: Brigade Engineer Battalion
- Part of: 2nd Brigade Combat Team, 1st Cavalry Division
- Garrison/HQ: Fort Cavazos
- Nickname: "Trojan Horse"
- Engagements: World War II; Korean War; Vietnam War; Gulf War; Iraq; Afghanistan

Insignia
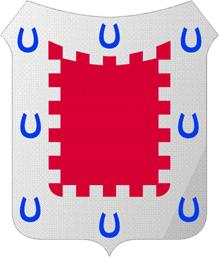
- Distinctive unit insignia

The 8th Engineer Battalion ("Trojan Horse") is a brigade engineer battalion (BEB) of the United States Army, which traces its history back to 1916. The battalion is based at Fort Cavazos, Texas, as part of the 2nd Brigade Combat Team of the 1st Cavalry Division.

== History ==
=== Establishment and Pancho Villa Incursion ===
The 8th Engineer Battalion was born, in part, due to the Mexican Revolutionary General Pancho Villa. Trouble between the United States and Villa increased in October 1915, when the United States government officially recognized Villa's rival Venustiano Carranza, as head of the Mexican government. Additionally, the U.S. provided transportation to over 5,000 Carrancistas from Eagle Pass, Texas to Douglas, Arizona for them to fight Villa's forces at the Second Battle of Agua Prieta. As a result, Villa's forces were defeated. Feeling betrayed, Villa began attacking U.S. nationals and their property in northern Mexico. On November 26, 1915, Villa sent a force to attack the city of Nogales and in the course of the ensuing battle, engaged with American forces before withdrawing.

On March 9, 1916, General John J. Pershing, commanding the district headquartered at Fort Bliss, Texas, received word that Villa's men were on the border prepared to make an attack that would embarrass the Carranza government and force the United States to intervene. Raids were so commonplace that the rumor was not seen as credible. However, all of the changed at approximately 4:00 am on March 9, 1916. Villa's troops attacked Columbus, New Mexico, and Camp Furlong, a U.S. Army post, where 240 soldiers from the 13th Cavalry Regiment were stationed. Ten civilians and eight soldiers were killed in the attack. Six soldiers and two civilians were wounded. Villa's troops burned the town, stole horses and mules, and seized machine guns, ammunition and merchandise, before fleeing to Mexico.

The next day, Southern Department Commanding General Frederick Funston recommended an immediate pursuit into Mexico. U.S. President Woodrow Wilson concurred, designating General Pershing to command the force.

On 1 July 1916, the 1st Battalion Mounted Engineers was established in the United States Army, which was the precursor to the 8th Engineer Battalion.

On 27 July 1921, the battalion was reassigned to the 1st Cavalry Division. In 1923, the 1st Cavalry Division assembled at Camp Marfa, Texas to stage its first Divisional level exercise. Though the maneuvers covered 900 square miles, the 8th Engineer Battalion mapped and marked the entire area.

=== Korea ===
In 1964, the 8th Engineer Battalion was in Korea, where they were involved in multiple training exercises and construction projects. They built 64 reinforced concrete bunkers in very difficult terrain, as well as a 48-foot-long steel stringer bridge, two bailey bridges, and installed a large culvert. But they did not just conduct military operations. They were also one of the principle sponsors of the Pak-Ai Orphanage, supporting it with monetary contributions, gifts of clothing/ school supplies for the children, and volunteer work, including teaching and physical labor during their off-duty hours.

=== Vietnam War ===
On 1 July 1965, the 11th Air Assault Division at Fort Benning, which tested the new idea of airmobile operations, was redesignated as the 1st Cavalry Division. The 1st Cavalry Division in Korea was redesignated as the 2nd Infantry Division. Along with that, the 127th Engineer Battalion was reflagged as the 8th Engineer Battalion. However, they had a vigorous challenge before them, as almost 40% of the soldiers were new to the battalion. In the Fort Benning heat, they immediately began training, including rappelling, aerial mine-laying, and sling loading. They were motivated by the knowledge that they would likely play a part in the growing conflict in Vietnam. Further, in order to be fully prepared, MAJ Virl N. Daas, along with several other competent assistants, began packing their equipment under the guise of training exercises, while the rest of the battalion finished up their qualifications.

Therefore, when President Johnson announced on July 27 that he was going to send the Airmobile Division to Vietnam, they were ready. On 15 August, the battalion packed up and rode in buses to Charleston for their flight to Asia.

The battalion arrived in Vietnam by mid-September and oversaw the construction of Camp Radcliff, the base camp of the 1st Cavalry. In addition to base construction, in which they were assisted by the 70th Engineer Battalion, the battalion also leveled the top of Hon Cong Mountain, which overlooked Camp Radcliff, so that a signal relay station could be established there. After levelling the top of the mountain with a single Caterpillar D6B bulldozer and explosives, the engineers set up a security fence around the station and constructed bunkers for it. While engaged in the development of the signal station, which was completed within a month, the battalion exchanged fire with Viet Cong forces over several nights. At Camp Radcliff, together with the 70th Engineer Battalion and 2,000 Vietnamese laborers, the battalion constructed perimeter defenses, which ultimately included four lines of barbed wire, Claymore anti-personnel mines, and inner and outer cattle fences; these extended to a depth of 100 yards (91 m) beyond the camp.

While this construction was ongoing, several members of the battalion participated in an infusion program, where they spent two weeks with other units to become familiar with operations in the country. Captain Richard R. Weisner, an ex-Ranger instructor and commander of the 8th Engineer Battalion HHC, was with a unit of the 173rd Brigade when it became engaged in a furious firefight. A number of US soldiers were wounded by the intense enemy fire. In spite of the deadly barrage, Captain Weisner, as an attachment with no other responsibilities, voluntarily made several trips carrying the wounded to the rear, returning with their ammunition and distributing it among the men on the firing line. He then took charge of the unit's demolition personnel and cleared a Landing Zone (LZ) to evacuate the wounded soldiers. For his actions he was awarded the Bronze Star.

The battalion's first major action started in late October, when they supported the relief of the beleaguered Special Forces Camp at Plei Me by enlarging airfields, clearing landing zones, and destroying captured enemy materiel and bunkers. When the camp was relieved, two platoons moved in to repair the airfield, which had been cratered by a 750-pound bomb.

Members from “Charlie” Company now rotated into the battle area with 3rd Brigade, and immediately began clearing landing zones and supporting the infantry with demolitions. Two demo teams were involved in the now immortalized fighting in the Ia Drang Valley. Sergeant Nye was the team leader of the seven-man demolition team on the ground with (then) Lieutenant Colonel Hal Moore throughout the fighting at LZ X-Ray. In the intense fighting that day, Hal Moore notes that he needed to clear out a secondary landing zone due to the heavy fire on the main LZ. In his book, We Were Soldiers Once... and Young, he describes: “I turned to my demolition-team leader, Sergeant George Nye of the 8th Engineer Battalion, and told him to get those trees down.” Sergeant Nye recalls that “[a]ll of a sudden the fire became heavier and heavier and the perimeter just seemed to erupt into a melee of constant fire. You could see the enemy, and suddenly we were part of the 1st Battalion, 7th Cavalry. It's tough to try to be an infantryman and a demolitions specialist at the same time, but we did it. We blew those trees; no sawing. The intensity of the fire made working with a saw tough, working without a weapon. By blowing the trees we could spend more time fighting.” This scene is depicted in the film We Were Soldiers, where the secondary landing zone is cleared with demolitions. Here, the engineers provided both their primary function as combat engineers, and their secondary function as infantrymen. In their efforts at that battle, two men of the team gave their lives.

While providing combat support to the front lines, the 8th Engineer Battalion also provided construction support, constructing a 20 kilometer long, 100 meter deep obstacle of barbed wire and mines to encircle the Division base camp. Three platoons were used at a time, augmented by 60 local Vietnamese. Further, they also did initial work for the construction of a Battalion-size camp near Pleiku. This was the preferred assignment, as there was a large lake nearby, which was excellent for swimming, as well as being close to Pleiku itself.

In the last major operation of 1965, they supported 3rd Brigade in Operation “Clean House”. In this operation, they were used extensively as infantrymen. They did demolition work, and maintained roads. Also, the Battalion S2, Major Zolnowski, coordinated engineer reconnaissance of all the major roads in the II Corps area. These reconnaissance missions were conducted by helicopter at treetop level, and involved landing at each bridge to record the data necessary for classification. This was another major way in which the 8th provided effective support to the Corps.

Additionally, the 8th also voluntarily helped the Vietnamese around them, such as Captain Meisner, the battalion surgeon, who held sick call in the refugee village nearby several times a week. He was compassionate to the suffering, but threw those feigning illness out of his office and back to work. Major Zolnowski also helped design and supervise construction of a playground for the refugee village. However, few worked harder than the battalion maintenance team, led by CWO Kristol, who led a never-ending struggle to keep the 8th Engineer's vehicles and equipment running. Additionally, they did the welding on all construction projects, and still found time to construct a 55-gallon drum concrete mixer.

In the beginning of 1966, the battalion supported Operation Matador by providing demolitions and landing zone clearing teams to the infantry battalions, as well as clearing roads and minefields. From late January to June, they took on the additional duty of airfield construction, constructing seven new airfields, doubling the length of two others, and repairing other airfields. In these operations, they utilized D6B dozers, tractor-scrapers, graders, rollers, dump trucks, and the first ever use of the rubber/nylon T-17 runway surfacing material. In multiple instances, because of a short timeline and the inaccessibility of the location, all the personnel and equipment were airlifted in, and the airfields were completed. These were the first fully airmobile airfield construction operations of the war.

One example of this is during Operation Masher, where the battalion was tasked to construct a C7A airfield a few kilometers north of Bong Son. Company A (-), with an attached equipment platoon, moved overland to their assigned location. They arrived on 28 January and began work on the same day. After working around the clock for 70 hours, they completed their mission. However, in what was to become characteristic of the men of the 8th, they did not stop working, but continued on their own initiative for another day until the airstrip was capable of handling C-123 aircraft.

In another instance, while providing their own security, the engineers of the 8th constructed the required runway, but then continued to work, providing a parking apron of 10 aircraft and 3 kilometers of access and service roads, making the airfield much more usable. They did not settle for the minimum, but insisted on excellence.

One of the most noteworthy aspects of this period was the way in which the units conducted operations over a wide area with short reaction times, and completed their tasks efficiently and effectively.

Over the summer of 1966, the 8th continued to provide engineer support with tunnel destruction, mine sweeping, fortification construction, timber bridge construction, airfield construction, landing zone clearance, and fighting as infantry. The engineers frequently had to rappel or use the troop ladder into the dense vegetation in order to prepare landing zones, which sometimes took from 1200 to 1400 pounds of demolitions to clear. The monsoon season especially taxed the abilities of the 8th, requiring great efforts to keep the roads open. Through great exertions, commitment, and in spite of multiple casualties, they completed their tasks over the summer.

Throughout the summer, the 8th found itself spread from the Cambodian border to the South China Sea, fulfilling the many demands on it from the 1st Cavalry Division. In September and October, over 750 bunkers were destroyed, 4 tunnel systems were destroyed, roads were constructed and repaired, airfields were maintained, drainage structures were emplaced, and they even used rafts, pontoons, and an assault boat to patrol the river. Through the end of the year, after the Viet Cong burned six newly constructed wooden bridges, the engineers airlifted in all the supplies and rebuilt all the bridges the same day. This was a brilliant display of the capabilities and motivation of the airmobile engineers.

Throughout the first two years of the war, the 8th Engineer Battalion accomplished a myriad of missions, and many individuals were awarded medals for valor, including one Legion of Merit, two Silver Stars, four Soldier's Medals, and 8 Bronze Stars with Valor Device, in addition to many other medals and awards. Those two years of success were not without great cost and sacrifice, as they suffered 11 killed and 64 wounded.

In the Battle of Tam Quan, in 1967, the engineers of Company A served their secondary role as infantry, when they advanced alongside of or in front of the infantry for the first 40 hours of the fighting. In one instance, 1LT Diers assumed command of an infantry company when the company commander was wounded, reorganizing the perimeter in order to medevac the wounded. In recognition for their excellent engineer support, they received high praises from LTG Rossen and MG Tolson, who presented two Silver Stars, a Bronze Star with Valor Device. In 1967, the battalion suffered 4 killed and 59 wounded.

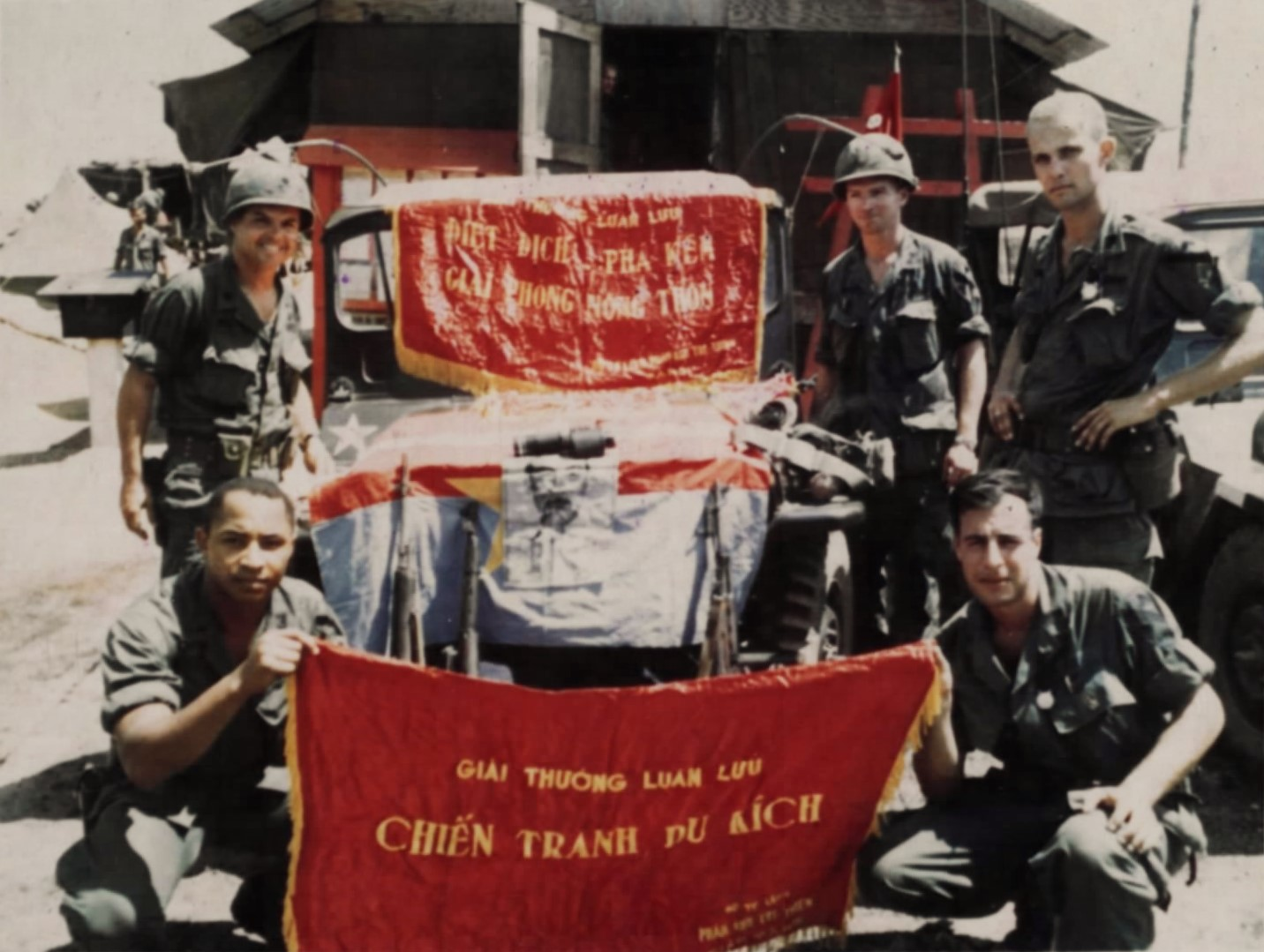
8th Engineer Battalion in Vietnam 1968

In 1968, at a Marine outpost south of Quang Tri, four members of the 8th Engineer Battalion were cited for heroism for helping to repel a fanatical attack by enemy sappers who had penetrated the perimeter, suffering two casualties in the assault. In February, 1LT Duke and 1LT Manule, each with a combat engineer squad, provided direct support to 2nd Battalion, 12th Cavalry, in the Titi Woods. Suffering only one wounded, the engineers killed seven NVA while fighting alongside the infantry. Later, the engineers taught the infantry how to use satchel charges, helping them in the second battle in Titi Woods, where the engineers, along with the trained infantry, used over 500 pounds of explosives.

One fine testament to the independent fighting capabilities of the 8th Engineer Battalion came on 16 August 1968, when two platoons from Company B were on Landing Zone Nancy, making preparations for Second Brigade to air assault in later. Shortly after midnight on 16 August, the platoons were subjected to a heavy mortar and rocket attacks, followed by a heavy ground attack on their southern side of the perimeter. At multiple points the perimeter was breached by enemy sappers, who charged onto the landing zone. Not to be outdone, however, Bravo Company's sappers battled back, stymied the attacks, and threw them out of the perimeter. In the two hour battle, the platoons repulsed all attacks, suffering only six wounded and one killed. For this action, 7 Bronze Stars with “V” Device were awarded to the valiant soldiers of Bravo Company.

On 12 August 1969, Quan Loi was attacked by two enemy sapper companies under the cover of intense rocket and mortar fire. The enemy breached the friendly lines at two locations around the perimeter, but 3rd Platoon of Company C, 8th Engineers, quickly moved to positions behind the breached points in the perimeter, blocking the enemy from penetrating into the main base. Third platoon was instrumental in repelling the attack. In 1969, the 8th Engineers provided combat and construction support under challenging and dangerous circumstances, suffering 15 killed and 72 wounded in action, with individuals receiving 4 Legions of Merit, 3 Silver Stars, and 62 Bronze Stars for Valor.

Operations in Cambodia included demolishing captured equipment, constructing firebases, clearing fields of fire, and fighting alongside the infantry. One example of their operations was in late May, when elements from Charlie Company rappelled into thick jungle to cut Pickup Zones. They cut a total of 7 PZs out of the jungle. During one attack, SSG Dennis Kiger volunteered to fight with an infantry company, and his heroism under fire merited the Distinguished Service Cross.

Mine sweeps were very important during this period, and the observant members of the 8th Engineer Battalion saved countless lives due to their vigilance. In one instance, during a bridge project, one soldier discovered a booby-trapped 105 mm shell, preventing numerous injuries. “Charlie” Company also provided a quick response engineer team, used to rescue downed helicopters by rappelling or walking to the site and clearing landing zones. They also used their assault boats for a mission in October.

== Modern Day Trojan Horse ==
=== 2010–2011 Operations ===
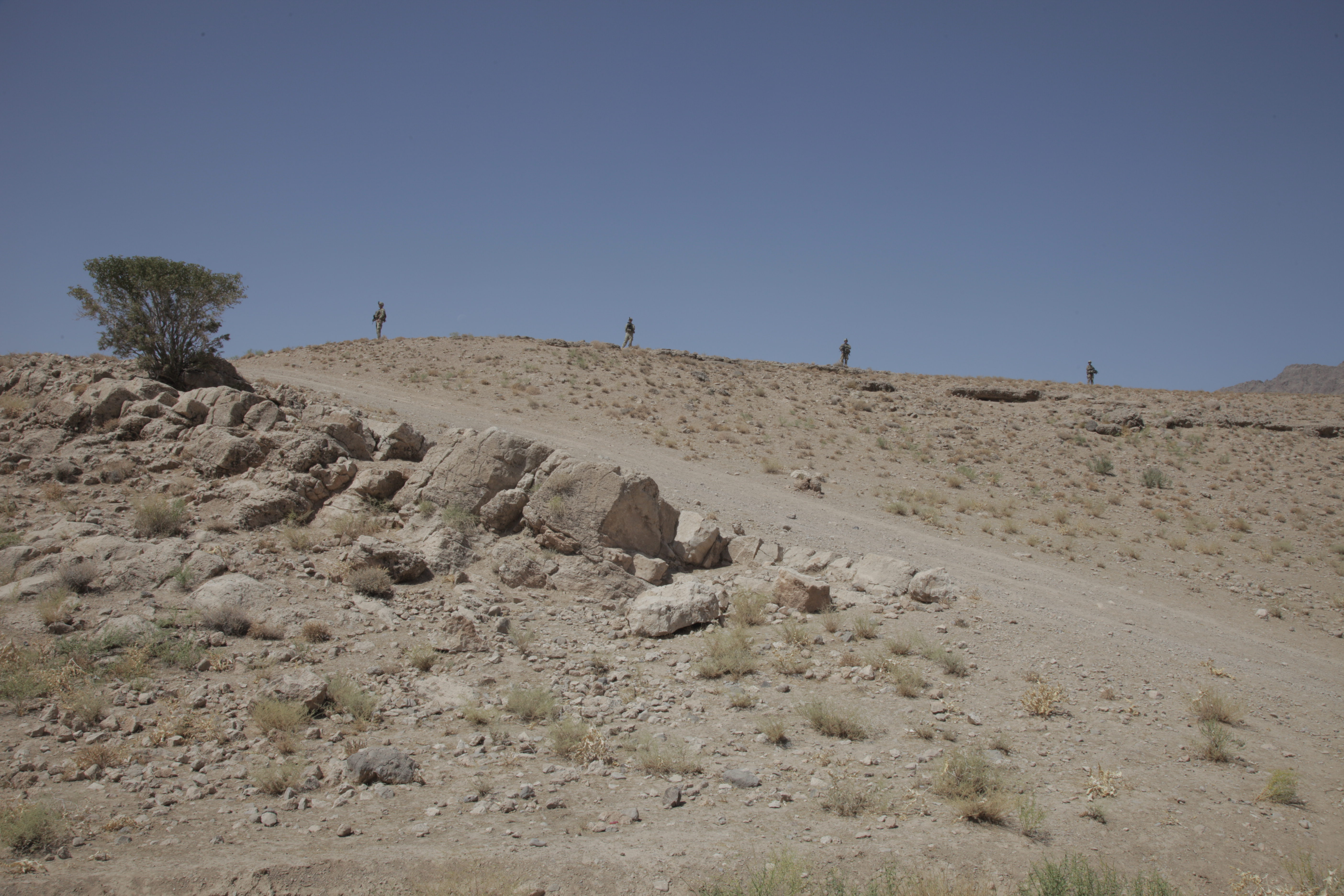
Soldiers from the 8th Engineer Battalion and other units conduct a site survey in Afghanistan 2011

The 8th Engineer Battalion deployed in support of Operation Enduring Freedom, Afghanistan during 2010 through 2011. Designated "Task Force Trojan Horse" the unit was responsible for Counter Improvised Explosive Device (C-IED) operations in Regional Command (RC) South, Afghanistan. Task Force Trojan Horse comprised the Headquarters and Headquarters Company, Field Support Company, 937th Clearance Company, 87th Sapper Company, 59th Mobility Augmentation Company and the 572nd Mobility Augmentation Company.

November 18, 2011, PFC Adam E. Dobereiner of Moline, IL was killed in action while in Kandahar Province, Afghanistan after suffering wounds sustained by an Improvised Explosive Device (IED). He was laid to rest at Rock Island National Cemetery in Illinois.

=== 2015 Operations ===
The 2nd Brigade Special Troops Battalion (2BSTB) was deactivated September 2014 and in its place the 8th Engineer Battalion was reactivated. In February 2015, the 8BEB deployed to NTC and conducted Decisive Action Rotation 15–05 with special emphasis on WMD-E in order to train and certify units and leaders to deploy to the PACOM area of operations. While at NTC the engineers exercised mission command and refined mission command-on-the-move during combined arms operations using austere command posts. The 8BEB successfully increased lethality of companies and battalion task forces through situational training exercises, realistic live fire exercises, and force-on-force maneuver training. After a successful rotation to NTC the battalion prepared for its first Brigade Rotation to the RoK.

In July 2015, the battalion deployed to the RoK in order to continue deterrence of North Korean aggression. If deterrence failed, the battalion was prepared to conduct decisive operations in support of the US-RoK alliance. 8BEBs priority was to integrate wide area security, establish CBRN defense and partnership training with RoK Allies during all training opportunities. The intense threat of North Korea aggression instilled a “Fight Tonight” mentality which drove the battalion to always be ready. Throughout the rotation 8BEB maintained equipment at the highest state of readiness and maintained personnel discipline and professionalism through dedicated leader involvement and professional development/cultural awareness to improve relationships with the RoK allies and the Korean community.

From July through October 8BEB participated in the combat platform qualification gunnery, and WMD-E Exercises on Rodriguez Live-Fire Complex Range in order to create lethal crews that can accurately execute fires to accomplish assigned missions. Upon completion, all available 8BEB Bradley Tank crews were qualified in combined arms fires. The battalion was able to execute and support combined arms operations, battalion operations, sustainment functions, and higher level key collective tasks.

From September to October 2015, 8BEB participated in WTX; a simulation supported, multi-echelon, fully integrated tactical and non-tactical Command Post Exercise (CPX). 8BEB participated under 2ABCTs Tactical Operations Center (TOC) and Response Cells located at Camp Casey. 2ABCT provided direct support to 8th Army and 2ID during the exercise. 8BEB successfully provided C2 (Intelligence) for 2ABCT and sister Battalions, while simultaneously facilitating staff processes for WMD-E Operations and Decisive Action in a constructive environment.

In November 2015, 8BEB conducted Non-Combatant Evacuation Operations (NEO) training and validation in order to validate NEO plans, infrastructure, communications and mission command nodes, to improve the readiness of leaders and units. 8BEB ensured that key NEO personnel were trained to 2ID standard, and that units operating Assembly Points (APs) properly conducted mass accountability, processing, transport, and reporting of Non-Combatant Evacuees (NCEs).

=== 2016 Operations ===
In January 2016, the battalion conducted a battalion rollout in order to determine communication readiness. Throughout the entire month of January and early February 8BEB set conditions for the RIP/TOA and prepared for 91BEB's arrival, and a change of responsibility of the Camp Casey/Hovey area of operations. The Battalion8BEB left Korea with 91BEB, 3ABCT taking responsibility of the Camp Hovey/Casey area in March. After the Soldiers had quality time with their loved ones, the battalion focused on re-establishing systems, maintenance, property accountability, and physical fitness.

From April to May 2016, the 8BEB participated in the Division Level WFX a simulation supported, multi-echelon, fully integrated tactical and non-tactical CPX. 8BEB supported 1st Cavalry Divisions (1CD) WFX 16–1. The combined efforts of 1CD improved the 8BEB Military Decision Making Process (MDMP), synchronized planning, and successful unified land operations with focus on Weapons of Mass Destruction (WMD) Operations.

=== 2017 Operations ===
The 8th Brigade Engineer Battalion prepared for its 2017 rotation to NTC by sending key command and staff personnel to NTC to conduct a Pre-Deployment Site Survey (PDSS) and Leaders Training Program (LTP) in order to set conditions for NTC Rotation 17–04. After qualifying the Bradley crews and engineers, and getting a better understanding of the future fight ahead at NTC, the battalion conducted Combined Arms Live Fire Exercises (CALFEX) in November–December 2016.

8BEB deployed to NTC in February 2017 to prepare for the upcoming deployment to Korea in July 2017. The battalion focused on large scale breaching operations with adjacent units 1-5 Cav and 1-8 Cav in order to allow those elements to close with and destroy enemy forces. They also trained on emplacing obstacles and building survivability positions to limit the movement of the enemy.

After the rotation to NTC 8th Engineer battalion continued focusing on weapons qualification to certify soldiers for the upcoming deployment to Korea. These ranges verified the Soldiers were prepared to “Fight Tonight’. The battalion began the deployment process in July 2017.

During the initial part of their deployment, the battalion conducted Ulchi Freedom Guardian Computer Augmented Exercise (USG CAX) with forces across the peninsula. This exercise tested the Battalion Staff on their combat readiness. Battalions conducted TOC exercises in deploying forces against a simulated North Korean attack. Additionally, the engineers conducted a dig exercise, testing their equipment’ ability in digging survivability positions and area clearing operations alongside the RoK forces. This exercise showed the RoK forces our capabilities while building relations amongst the soldiers of both units.

Another key training event that the 8th Engineers conducted was the Courageous Channel Training Exercise. The goal of this training was to prepare the battalion to evacuate up to 10,000 non-combatants out of the peninsula, in the event of an attack. 8BEB played an integral part in this operation to ensure the safety of both U.S. and South Korean civilians in the event of a global incident occurring.

During their time in Korea, the hard work of Bravo Company ensured the successful launch of their volcano system. Not only was the battalion able to complete a successful test fire of the Volcano mine laying system but Alpha Company successfully completed a live fire exercise with the mine clearing line charge (MICLIC). 8BEB completed their rotation to Korea in February 2018.

== Lineage ==
On 1 July 1916, the 8th Engineer Battalion was established in the United States Army as the 1st Battalion Mounted Engineers.

On 29 July 1917, the units were reorganized and designated as the 8th Engineer Battalion (Mounted) and on 27 November 1917, was assigned to the 15th Cavalry Division.

On 27 July 1921, the battalion was reassigned to the 1st Cavalry Division. The battalion enjoys the distinction of being one of only two units continuously assigned to the 1st Cavalry Division, since the organization of the Division.

On 15 March 1943, the Engineer Squadron was reorganized and re-designated as the 8th Engineer Combat Squadron.

On 25 March 1949, the 8th Engineer Combat Squadron was redesignated as the 8th Engineer Combat Battalion.

From 1949 to 1953, the 8th Engineer Combat Battalion served in the Korean War. They helped establish the Pusan Perimeter.

In 1964, the 8th Engineer Battalion was in Korea again, where they were involved in multiple training exercises and construction projects.

In 1965, the battalion served in Vietnam. The engineers were even involved at the Battle of Ia Drang, involving (then) Lieutenant Colonel Hal Moore.

In 2003–04, the battalion deployed to fight in the Iraq War.

On 24 May 2005, the 8th Engineer Battalion was inactivated.

On 16 August 2007, the 8th Engineer Battalion was reactivated and on 16 October 2007, became part of the 36th Engineer Brigade.

In December 2010, the 8th Engineer Battalion deployed to Kandahar Province, Afghanistan as part of Operation Enduring Freedom until December 2011. The battalion returned to Afghanistan in 2013.

On 16 June 2014, the battalion was assigned to the 2d Brigade Combat Team, 1st Cavalry Division. The 2nd Brigade Special Troops Battalion (2BSTB) was deactivated September 2014 and in its place the 8th Engineer Battalion was reactivated.

== Individual citations ==
=== Medal of Honor Recipient ===
==== PFC Melvin L. Brown ====
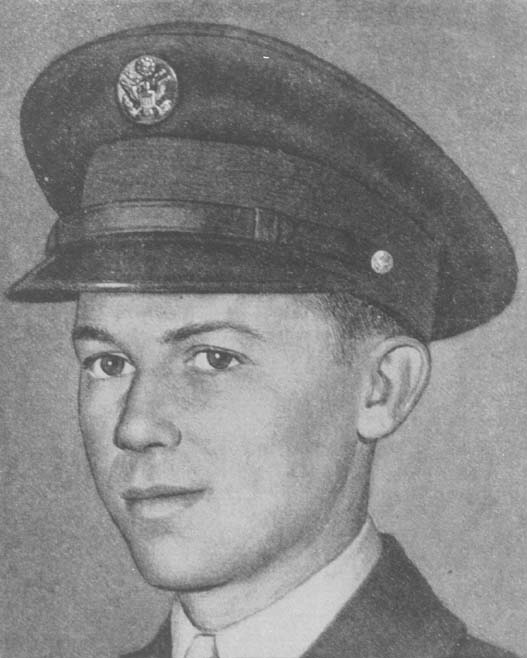

PFC. Brown, Company D distinguished himself by conspicuous gallantry and intrepidity above and beyond the call of duty in action against the enemy. While his platoon was securing Hill 755 (the Walled City), the enemy, using heavy automatic weapons and small arms, counterattacked. Taking a position on a 50-foot-high wall he delivered heavy rifle fire on the enemy. His ammunition was soon expended and although wounded, he remained at his post and threw his few grenades into the attackers causing many casualties. When his supply of grenades was exhausted his comrades from nearby foxholes tossed others to him and he left his position, braving a hail of fire, to retrieve and throw them at the enemy. The attackers continued to assault his position and Pfc. Brown weaponless, drew his entrenching tool from his pack and calmly waited until they 1 by 1 peered over the wall, delivering each a crushing blow upon the head. Knocking 10 or 12 enemy from the wall, his daring action so inspired his platoon that they repelled the attack and held their position. Pfc. Brown's extraordinary heroism, gallantry, and intrepidity reflect the highest credit upon himself and was in keeping with the honored traditions of the military service. Reportedly missing in action and officially killed in action, September 5, 1950.

=== Distinguished Service Cross Recipients ===
==== 1LT Richard Eiler ====
Richard O. Eiler: Distinguished Service Cross Citation

The President of the United States takes pride in presenting the Distinguished Service Cross (Posthumously) to Richard O. Eiler (0-58140), First Lieutenant (Corps of Engineers), U.S. Army, for extraordinary heroism in connection with military operations against an armed enemy of the United Nations while serving as a Platoon Leader of Company D, 8th Engineer Combat Battalion, 1st Cavalry Division. First Lieutenant Eiler distinguished himself by extraordinary heroism in action against enemy aggressor forces at Kasan, Korea, on 5 September 1950. Defending the right flank of the company perimeter, Lieutenant Eiler's platoon was subjected to vicious hostile fire from two machine-guns which reduced its strength to twelve men, several of whom were wounded. In order to save his depleted unit from potential annihilation, Lieutenant Eiler crawled fifty yards up a slope, threw two grenades into an emplacement, and silenced one harassing gun. Returning to his platoon, he ordered its withdrawal in the face of a renewed and determined enemy attack, and proceeded to provide covering fire for his men. While assisting the wounded men over a high wall obstructing the withdrawal, he was seriously wounded, but ordered his men to continue on to safety without him. Selecting a position which provided an excellent field of observation, he delivered a withering fire into the hostile ranks until his position was overrun and he was mortally wounded.

==== SFC Eugense Postlethwait ====
The President of the United States takes pride in presenting the Distinguished Service Cross (Posthumously) to Clarence Eugene Postlethwait (RA06898582), Sergeant First Class [then Sergeant], U.S. Army, for extraordinary heroism in connection with military operations against an armed enemy of the United Nations while serving as a medical aidman with Company C, 8th Engineer Combat Battalion, 8th Cavalry Regiment (Infantry), 1st Cavalry Division. Sergeant First Class Postlethwait distinguished himself by extraordinary heroism in action against enemy aggressor forces at Unsan, Korea, on 2 November 1950. On that date, the 3d Battalion, 8th Cavalry Regiment (Infantry) was completely surrounded and contained in a small defense perimeter in an open field and pinned down by heavy concentrations of enemy automatic small-arms fire. There were approximately 125 American wounded within the defense perimeter who had received no medical attention due to the fact that all medical supplies were aboard a truck which had to be abandoned during the preceding night's furious engagement and which was located at an exposed point approximately 75 yards outside the defense perimeter, in full view of the enemy. Sergeant First Class Postlethwait fearlessly volunteered to attempt to reach the truck and bring back medications and bandages to enable the battalion surgeon to render emergency treatment to the wounded. With utter disregard for his own safety, he left the comparative cover of the defense perimeter, made his way to the truck amidst bursts of fire from enemy snipers, and collected the necessary medical supplies. He had all but arrived back at the defense perimeter when he was mortally wounded by fragments from enemy grenades.

==== SFC Ales Wagner ====
Burton Ales Wagner: Distinguished Service Cross Citation

The President of the United States takes pride in presenting the Distinguished Service Cross (Posthumously) to Burton Ales Wagner (RA16242452), Sergeant First Class, U.S. Army, for extraordinary heroism in connection with military operations against an armed enemy of the United Nations while serving with Company A, 8th Engineer Combat Battalion, 1st Cavalry Division. Sergeant First Class Wagner distinguished himself by extraordinary heroism in action against enemy aggressor forces at Yopo-ri, North Korea, on 2 December 1950. Given the mission of providing security for a crew from his company in the process of building a bridge across the Taedong River, Sergeant First Class Wagner was checking his positions for maximum defense when suddenly attacked by Chinese Communist troops apparently intent on sweeping through his line of resistance and destroying the bridgehead. He courageously moved forward alone to engage and sufficiently delay the foe in order that the members of the crew might be alerted against surprise attack. Armed only with a carbine, he fearlessly exposed himself to enemy observation and action and delivered a deadly accurate fire into the advancing hostile force until his position was overrun and he was mortally wounded. Sergeant Wagner's magnificent stand alerted the company and enabled the men to contain the enemy attack and save the bridgehead.

=== Silver Star Recipients ===
==== PVT Vernon Hardin ====
The President of the United States of America, authorized by Act of Congress July 9, 1918, takes pride in presenting the Silver Star (Posthumously) to Private Vernon C. Hardin (ASN: RA-14297781), United States Army, for gallantry in action as a member of Company C, 8th Engineer Combat Battalion, 1st Cavalry Division, in action against the enemy on 11 October 1950, near Kaesong, Korea. When it became necessary for an area in front of advancing friendly infantry troops to be cleared of concealed anti-personnel mines, Private Hardin immediately volunteered for the dangerous assignment. Although intense artillery and mortar shells were rocking and showering the mine field with jagged shrapnel, he moved out with his men detection equipment and courageously started to sweep the area. Forced to fling himself upon the ground when shells exploded close by, Private Hardin quickly arose after each burst and doggedly continued to search for the traps of death that would threaten his fellow soldiers if not found and removed. While engaged in this mission, Private Hardin made the supreme sacrifice when he was struck by enemy mortar fire. His extreme bravery and courageous devotion to duty, at the cost of his own life, aided materially in clearing a mined area for the passage of infantry troops. Private Hardin's gallantry is in keeping with the highest traditions of the military service.

==== CPL Robey Tyree ====
The President of the United States of America, authorized by Act of Congress July 9, 1918, takes pleasure in presenting the Silver Star to Corporal Robey J. Tyree (ASN:), United States Army, for gallantry in action as a member of Company B, 8th Engineer Combat Battalion, 1st Cavalry Division, in action against the enemy on 16 September 1950 near Shindo, Korea. Corporal Tyree and two comrades were attached to an infantry company in connection with mine laying activities. Being given the extremely dangerous mission of laying an anti-personnel minefield on a knoll approximately 75 yards in front of friendly lines and 50 yards in front of the enemy positions, he immediately set out on his assignment. A few minutes after arriving at the objective, while preparing his equipment, the enemy laid an extremely heavy barrage of mortar and small arms fire in his area. One of his comrades was lightly wounded, forcing him to return to the company for evacuation. After rendering first aid to the wounded man, Corporal Tyree fearlessly continued to lay the minefield. On several occasions he was forced to take what little cover the terrain afforded while the infantry repelled enemy bonsai attacks. When his remaining companion was wounded, he administered medical treatment and carried the wounded man through the heavy fire back to the company area for evacuation. Through courageous and selfless behavior, he was an inspiration to the men of the company and enabled them to strengthen their defense. Corporal Tyree's gallant actions and devotion to duty reflect great credit upon himself and the military service.

==== CPT Richard Green ====
The President of the United States of America, authorized by Act of Congress July 9, 1918, takes pleasure in presenting the Silver Star to Captain (Corps of Engineer), [then First Lieutenant] Richard I. Green, United States Army, for gallantry in action against the enemy as a member of Company A, 8th Engineer Combat Battalion, 1st Cavalry Division, in action on 4 September 1950, at Kanp-Yong, Korea. Company A was assigned the mission securing the center of a ridge overlooking the main supply route leading into Taegu. When the left flank of the ridge was attacked by a numerically superior enemy force and the infantry defenders were forced to withdraw, the flank became exposed and gave the enemy direct fire into the friendly units in the valley below. The North Koreans immediately began to drop mortars on the infantry command post and on friendly mortar positions. Captain Green quickly deployed his platoon to protect the exposed flank. Courageously leading a squad of men across the open ridge, he directed a counterattack in the face of heavy automatic weapons and small arms fire. Although it was impossible to retake the lost ground, Captain Green led a counterattack time after time with different groups of men, thereby forcing the enemy to cease fire on the friendly forces below. By this insistent attacking, the infantry troops in the valley were able to withdraw with a minimum of casualties. Captain Green's courageous action and devotion to duty reflect credit upon himself and the military service.

==== MSG Louis Gonzales ====
The President of the United States of America, authorized by Act of Congress, July 9, 1918, takes pleasure in presenting the Silver Star to Master Sergeant [then Sergeant First Class] Louis M. Gonzales (ASN: RA-20217702), United States Army, for conspicuous gallantry and intrepidity in action while serving with Company D, 8th Engineer Combat Battalion, 1st Cavalry Division, in action against the enemy at the Walled City, Kasan, Korea, from 4 September 1950 to 5 September 1950. The second platoon of Company D was assigned the mission of taking and holding the hill within the fortified city on 4 September 1950. When the attack was launched, the platoon leader was overcome with exhaustion. In the face of heavy mortar and automatic weapons fire, Master Sergeant Gonzalez promptly assumed command of the platoon and, evacuating the officer, reorganized the unit and directed its entrenchment. Throughout the enemy attacks which followed, without regard for his own safety, he personally directed the fire of his automatic weapons, repositioning them frequently to achieve maximum effectiveness. When the enemy troops were overwhelmingly reinforced and his position because untenable, he skillfully withdrew the platoon with all the wounded and equipment through intense enemy fire to safety. His prompt and vigorous action resulted in heavy casualties to the enemy and saved the platoon from annihilation. Master Sergeant Gonzalez' heroic actions reflect great credit upon himself and the military service.

==== CPL John Kraemer ====
The President of the United States of America, authorized by Act of Congress July 9, 1918, takes pleasure in presenting the Silver Star to Corporal [then Private First Class] John C. Kraemer (ASN: RA-13312844), United States Army, for conspicuous gallantry and intrepidity as a member of Company A, 8th Engineer Combat Battalion, 1st Cavalry Division, in action against the enemy on 26 July 1950 near Yongdong, Korea. Corporal Kraemer's platoon had prepared a bridge and a section of highway for demolition. Infiltrating enemy elements cut the wires to the demolition charges during the early morning. While the wires were being re-connected, the blasting machine came under heavy enemy machine gun fire. Corporal Kraemer and two comrades, with complete disregard for their own safety, moved the machine under heavy mortar fire, to a more tenable position and reconnected the wires for a second time. The bridge and highway section were then demolished, greatly retarding the advance of the enemy. Corporal Kraemer's gallant action reflects great credit upon himself and is in keeping with the highest traditions of the military service.

==== PFC Ward Owens ====
The President of the United States of America, authorized by Act of Congress July 9, 1918, takes pleasure in presenting the Silver Star to Corporal [then Private First Class] Ward E. Owens (ASN: RA-15412869), United States Army, for gallantry in action as a member of Company C, 8th Engineer Combat Battalion, 1st Cavalry Division, in action on 23 July 1950, near Yongdong, Korea. Corporal Owens, along with three other men, volunteered to remain in an exposed position under enemy artillery and mortar shelling throughout the night to operate a daisy chain of anti-tank mines should enemy tanks attack. One enemy tank was disabled by the mines. With complete disregard for their own safety, Corporal Owens and a companion attacked the halted tank with hand grenades, silencing its guns and killing its crew. Corporal Owens' gallant action reflected great credit upon himself and the military service.
