= 13th Division (North Korea) =

The 13th Infantry Division (Korean: 조선인민군 륙군 제13사단) was a military formation of the Korean People's Army during the 20th century.

It participated in the North Korean advance from Seoul to Daejeon.

The division fought in the Battle of Pusan Perimeter.
