= 1st Division (North Korea) =

Guards 1st Infantry Division
- Guards badge
- Active: 1948-present
- Country: North Korea
- Allegiance: Korean People's Army
- Branch: Korean People's Army Ground Force
- Type: Infantry division
- Size: Division
- Garrison/HQ: Kosong County, Kangwon Province
- Engagements: Korean War
- Decorations: Guards badge

The 1st Infantry Division is a military formation of the Korean People's Army.

== Korean War ==
During the initial offensives in 1950, the 1st Division was part of the North Korean advance from Seoul to Taejon.

The division fought in the Battle of Pusan Perimeter.

The intelligence section of U.S Far East Command headquarters listed the division's order of battle as of 31 July 1952 as follows:

- 2nd Regiment
- 3rd Regiment
- 14th Regiment
- Artillery Regiment

This same report listed the 1st Division as being in III Corps Reserve in the same time period.

== Postwar service ==
Though the present status of North Korean military units is often difficult to confirm, the last public information from the former Far East Command indicates the 1st Division is currently garrisoned in Kosong County, Kangwon Province.
