= Battle of Nam River =

1950 battle of the Korean War

- Part of the Battle of Pusan Perimeter
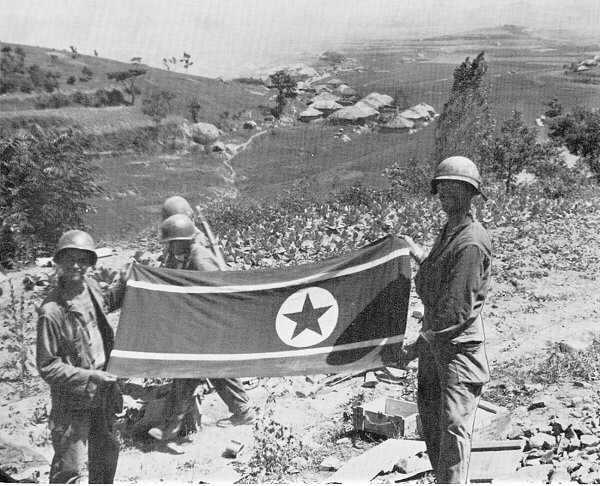
- Troops of the US 35th Infantry display a North Korean flag captured along the Nam River
Date	August 31 – September 19, 1950
Location	Nam River, South Korea
Result	United Nations victory

Belligerents
United States; South Korea	North Korea

Commanders and leaders
(United States) William B. Kean	Pang Ho San; Paek Nak Chil

Units involved
(United States) 25th Infantry Division: 27th Infantry Regiment; 35th Infantry Regiment; (First Republic of Korea) National Police	6th Division: 13th Infantry Regiment; 14th Infantry Regiment; 15th Infantry Regiment; 7th Division: 30th Infantry Regiment; 31st Infantry Regiment; 32nd Infantry Regiment

Strength
~15,000	20,000

Casualties and losses
~275 killed ~625 wounded	~11,000 killed and deserted

The Battle of Nam River was an engagement between the United Nations Command (UN) and North Korean forces early in the Korean War from August 31 to September 19, 1950, in the vicinity of the Nam River and the Naktong River in South Korea. It was a part of the Battle of Pusan Perimeter, and was one of several large engagements fought simultaneously. The battle ended in a victory for the United Nations after United States Army (US) troops repelled a Korean People's Army (KPA) attack across the river.

Positioned in defense of Masan during the Battle of Masan, the US 35th Infantry Regiment, 25th Infantry Division took up positions along the Nam River, one of the many tributaries of the Naktong River on the southern flank of the Pusan Perimeter. The KPA 7th Division crossed the river on August 31, and though the 35th Infantry stemmed the KPA advance, thousands of KPA troops exploited a hole in the line and surrounded the regiment. What followed was an intense battle in which the US and KPA units were heavily engaged all along and behind the Kum River line. Eventually, the KPA force was routed by the US troops.

During the battle, the US Army's 35th Infantry division was instrumental in forcing back the KPA division and preventing it from advancing to capture Pusan. The 35th Infantry's performance in the battle earned the regiment a Presidential Unit Citation.

== Background ==
=== Pusan Perimeter ===
From the outbreak of the Korean War and the invasion of South Korea by the North, the KPA had enjoyed superiority in both manpower and equipment over both the Republic of Korea Army (ROKA) and the UN forces dispatched to South Korea to prevent it from collapsing. The KPA tactics were to aggressively pursue ROKA/UN forces on all avenues of approach south and to engage them aggressively, attacking from the front and initiating a double envelopment of both flanks of the unit, which allowed the KPA to surround and cut off the opposing force, which would then be forced to retreat in disarray, often leaving behind much of its equipment. From their initial June 25 offensive to fights in July and early August, the KPA used these tactics to effectively defeat any ROKA/UN force and push it south. However, when the ROKA/UN forces, under the Eighth United States Army, established the Pusan Perimeter in August, the ROKA/UN troops held a continuous line along the peninsula which KPA troops could not flank, and their advantages in numbers decreased daily as the superior UN logistical system brought in more troops and supplies to the UN forces.

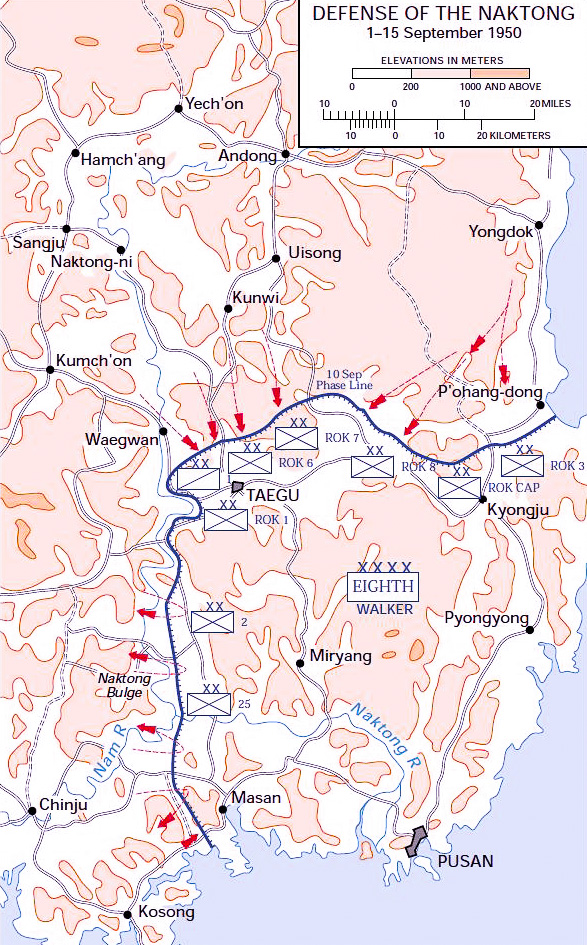
Map of the Pusan Perimeter Defensive line in September 1950 the Kyongju corridor is the northeasternmost sector.

When the KPA approached the Pusan Perimeter on August 5, they attempted the same frontal assault technique on the four main avenues of approach into the perimeter. Throughout August, the KPA 6th Division, and later the KPA 7th Division, engaged the US 25th Infantry Division at the Battle of Masan, initially repelling a UN counteroffensive before countering with battles at Komam-ni and Battle Mountain. These attacks stalled as UN forces, well equipped and with plenty of reserves, repeatedly repelled KPA attacks. North of Masan, the KPA 4th Division and the US 24th Infantry Division sparred in the Naktong Bulge area. In the First Battle of Naktong Bulge, the KPA division was unable to hold its bridgehead across the river as large numbers of US reserve forces were brought in to repel it, and on August 19, the KPA 4th Division was forced back across the river with 50 percent casualties. In the Taegu region, five KPA divisions were repulsed by three UN divisions in several attempts to attack the city during the Battle of Taegu. Particularly heavy fighting took place at the Battle of the Bowling Alley where the KPA 13th Division was almost completely destroyed in the attack. On the east coast, three more KPA divisions were repulsed by the ROKA at P'ohang-dong during the Battle of P'ohang-dong. All along the front, the KPA troops were reeling from these defeats, the first time in the war their tactics were not working.

=== September push ===
In planning its new offensive, the KPA command decided any attempt to flank the ROKA/UN force was impossible thanks to the support of the UN naval forces. Instead, they opted to use a frontal attack to breach the perimeter and collapse it; this was considered to be the only hope of achieving success in the battle. Informed by intelligence from the Soviet Union, the North Koreans were aware of the UN forces building up along the Pusan Perimeter and that they must conduct an offensive soon or they could not win the battle. A secondary objective was to surround Taegu and destroy the UN units in that city. As part of this mission, the KPA would first cut the supply lines to Taegu.

On August 20, the KPA commands distributed operations orders to their subordinate units. The plan called for a simultaneous five-prong attack against the ROKA/UN lines. These attacks would overwhelm the ROKA/UN defenders and allow the KPA to break through the lines in at least one place to force the ROKA/UN forces back. Five battle groupings were ordered. In the southern part of its sector, where the US 25th Infantry Division held the UN line, KPA I Corps planned a strong attack, coordinating it with an attack against the US 2nd Infantry Division to the north. The KPA 6th and 7th Divisions received their attack orders on August 20. The plan called for KPA I Corps to assault all along the line at 22:00 on August 31. The 6th Division, farthest south on the right flank, was to attack through Haman, Masan, and Chinhae and then capture Kumhae, on the west side of the Naktong River delta 15 miles (24 km) from Pusan, by September 3. The division zone of attack was to be south of the highway from Chinju to Komam-ni to Masan. The 7th Division, next in line north of the 6th Division, was to attack north of the Masan highway, wheel left to the Naktong, and wait for the 6th Division on its right and the KPA 9th Division on its left to join it. Part of the 7th Division was concentrated in the Uiryong area west of the Nam River. This plan pitted the 6th Division against the US 24th Infantry Regiment and the 7th Division against the US 35th Infantry Regiment. As a part of this plan, the KPA 6th Division had been engaging the 24th Infantry at Battle Mountain for several weeks prior, with no gains for either side.

== Battle ==
=== North Korean crossing ===
The KPA 7th Division troops committed all of their effort into attacking the US 35th Infantry line. At 23:30 on August 31, a KPA SU-76 self-propelled high-velocity gun from across the Nam fired shells into the position of G Company, 35th Infantry, overlooking the river (35.345°N 128.397°E). Within a few minutes, KPA artillery was attacking all front-line rifle companies of the regiment from the Namji-ri bridge west. Under cover of this fire a reinforced regiment of the KPA 7th Division crossed the Nam River and attacked F and G Companies, 35th Infantry. Other KPA soldiers crossed the Nam on an underwater bridge in front of the paddy ground north of Komam-ni and near the boundary between the 2nd Battalion, led by Lieutenant colonel John L. Wilkins Jr., holding the river front and Lieutenant colonel Bernard G. Teeter's 1st Battalion holding the hill line that stretched from the Nam River to Sibidang-san and the Chinju-Masan highway. The 35th Infantry, facing shortages of materiel and reinforcements, was under-equipped but nonetheless prepared for an attack.

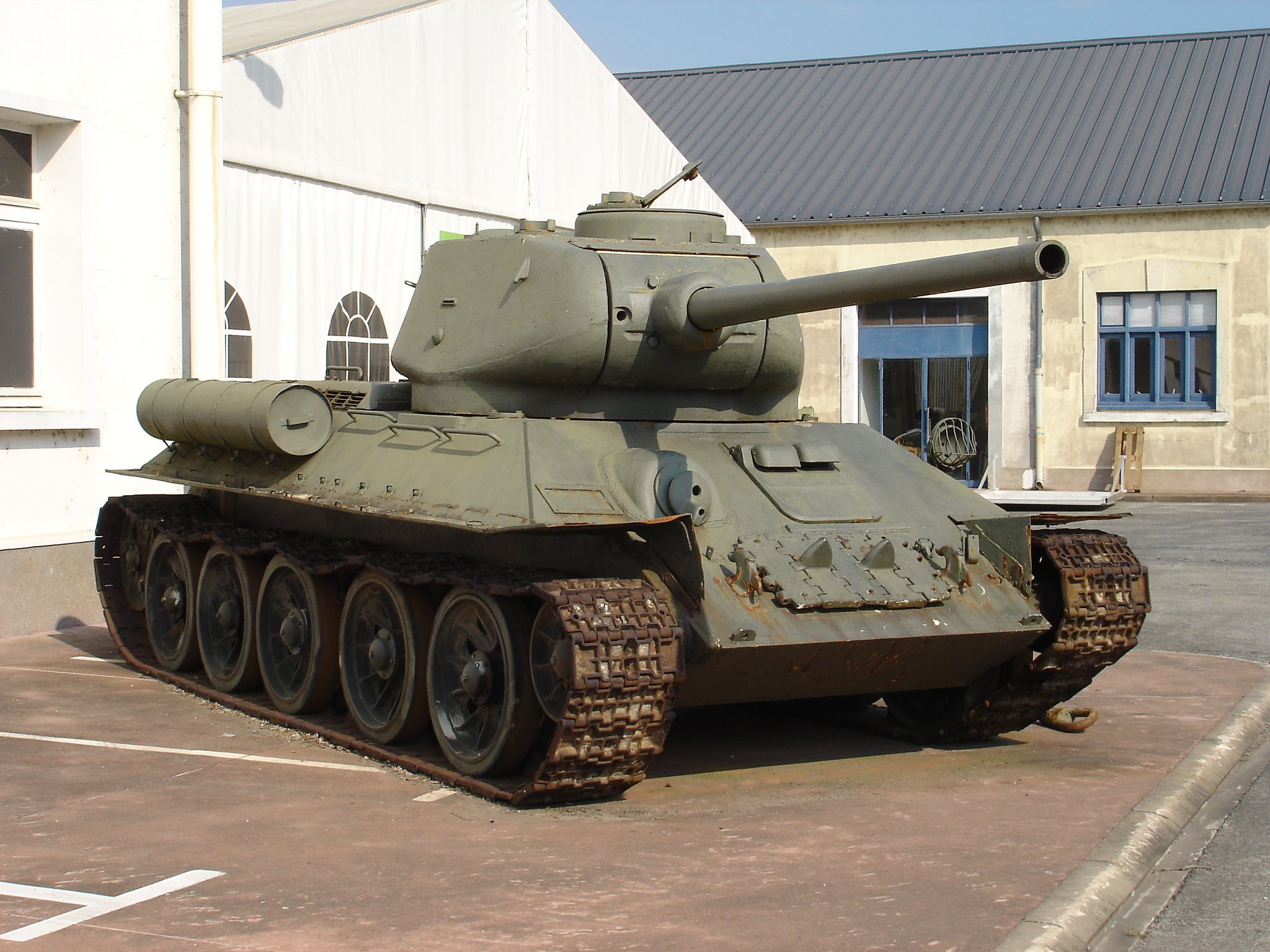
The T-34 tank was standard armor used by the North Korean Army in 1950 and was also present at Masan

At the river ferry crossing site in the low ground between these two battalions (35.315°N 128.398°E), the regimental commander placed 300 ROK National Police, expecting them to hold there long enough to serve as a warning for the rest of the forces. Guns from the flanking hills there could cover the low ground with fire. Back at Komam-ni he held the 3rd Battalion ready for use in counterattack to stop a KPA penetration should it occur. Unexpectedly, the National Police companies near the ferry scattered at the first KPA fire. At 00:30, KPA troops streamed through this hole in the line, some turning left to take G Company in its flank and rear, and others turned right to attack C Company, which was on a spur of ground west of the Komam-ni road. Elements of C and D Companies formed a defense line along the dike at the north edge of Komam-ni where US tanks joined them at dawn. The KPA, however, did not drive for the Komam-ni road fork 4 miles (6.4 km) south of the river as the US commander, Lieutenant colonel Henry Fisher had expected; instead, they turned east into the hills behind 2nd Battalion.

The position of B Company, 35th Infantry, on the 1,100 feet (340 m) Sibidang-san, flanked the Masan road 2 miles (3.2 km) west of Komam-ni and gave the company a commanding view over the surrounding countryside. It was a key position in the 25th Division line, and 25th Division commander General William B. Kean was aware the KPA would consider it important ground to target for attack. The KPA preparatory barrage there lasted from 11:30 to midnight. Under this cover, two battalions of the KPA 13th Regiment, 6th Division, moved up within 150 yards (140 m) of the American foxholes. At the same time, KPA T-34 tanks, SU-76 self-propelled guns, and antitank guns moved toward Komam-ni on the road at the foot of Sibidang-san. A US M4A3 Sherman tank there destroyed a T-34 just after midnight, and a 3.5-inch Bazooka team destroyed a self-propelled gun and several 45 mm antitank guns.

On the crest of Sibidang-san, an antipersonnel minefield stopped the first KPA infantry assault. More attacks followed in quick succession, all of which were repulsed by the US troops' superior firepower. By 02:30 the B Company riflemen were so depleted of ammunition that they began stripping machine-gun bullets from the ammunition belts and using them in their rifles. The 1st Platoon of C Company, at the base of the mountain behind B Company, climbed Sibidang-san in 45 minutes with an ammunition resupply for the company. Just before dawn the KPA attack subsided. Daylight revealed a vast amount of abandoned KPA equipment scattered on the slope just below the crest, including 33 machine-guns. Among the KPA dead was the commanding officer of the 13th Regiment.

At daybreak on September 1, a relief force of C Company headquarters troops, led by US tanks, cleared the road to Sibidang-san and resupplied the 2nd Platoon, B Company, with ammunition just in time for it to repel another KPA assault. This failed assault resulted in the killing of 77 and capturing of 21 KPA. Although the 35th Infantry held all its original positions, except that of the forward platoon of G Company, 3,000 KPA soldiers were behind its lines. The farthest eastern penetration reached the high ground just south of Chirwon overlooking the north–south road there.

In the meantime, the KPA 6th Division had made breakthroughs in the US 24th Infantry sector to the south, overwhelming the regiment and forcing it back. The 2nd Battalion, 24th Infantry, on the ridges overlooking Haman, was pushed back as its soldiers retreated without orders. Survivors from the 24th Infantry's 1st and 2nd battalions later appeared in the 35th's lines, and the regimental commanders found that the entire regiment had crumbled under KPA attack. Kean ordered the 1st Battalion, 27th Infantry to move in and help restore the 24th's position.

=== North Korean infiltration ===
In a counterattack after daylight, K Company and tanks had partially regained control of the ridges overlooking Haman, but not completely. Large numbers of KPA were behind the battle positions of the 35th Infantry as far as the Chirwon-ni and Chung-ni areas, 6 miles (9.7 km) east of Komam-ni and the front positions. The KPA continued to cross the Nam River after daylight on September 1 in the general area of the gap between the 1st and 2nd Battalions. UN observation aircraft spotted an estimated four companies crossing there and directed fire of the 64th Field Artillery Battalion on the crossing force, which destroyed an estimated three-fourths of it. Fighter planes then strafed the survivors. Another large group of KPA were spotted in the open at the river later in the day and American aircraft directed artillery fire on the column, with an estimated 200 KPA casualties.

The KPA I Corps plan of attack below the Nam River was for its 6th Division to push east along the main Chinju-Komam-ni-Masan highway through the 1st Battalion, 35th Infantry, and at the same time for major elements of its 7th Division to swing southeast behind the 2nd Battalion, 35th Infantry, and cut the Chirwon road. This road crossed the Naktong River over the cantilever steel bridge at Namji-ri from the US 2nd Infantry Division zone and ran south through Chirwon to join the main Masan highway 8 miles (13 km) east of Komam-ni near the village of Chung-ni, 4 miles (6.4 km) northwest of Masan. These two avenues of approach, the Komam-ni-Masan highway and the Chirwon road converging at Chung-ni, formed the axes of their attack plan.

US engineer troops counterattacking up the secondary road toward Chirwon during September 1 made slow progress, and the KPA stopped them in the early afternoon. The 35th Infantry was now surrounded by forces of the KPA 6th and 7th Divisions, with an estimated three battalions of them behind its lines. Speaking later of the situation, Fisher said, "I never intended to withdraw. There was no place to go. I planned to go into a regimental perimeter and hold."

=== US 2-27th Infantry counterattack ===
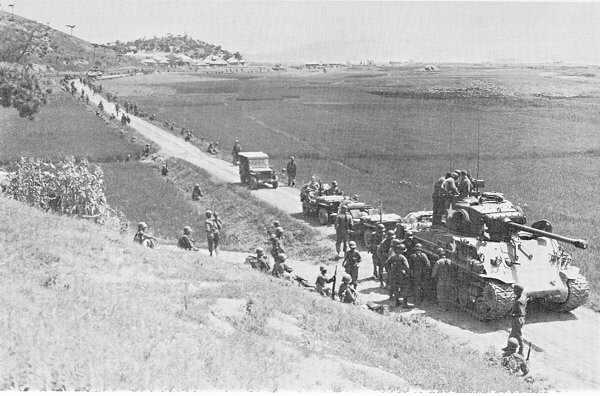
Troops of the 2nd Battalion, 27th Infantry traverse the recaptured Engineer Road.

By mid-afternoon, Kean felt that the situation was a severe threat to the integrity of the division's line. He ordered the 2nd Battalion, 27th Infantry Regiment, to attack behind the 35th Infantry, because a large part of the division's artillery there was under direct KPA infantry attack. During the morning hours of September 1, when the KPA 7th Division troops had attacked, the first American unit they encountered was G Company, 35th Infantry, at the north shoulder of the gap. While some KPA units peeled off to attack G Company, others continued on and engaged E Company, 2 miles (3.2 km) downstream from it, and still others attacked scattered units of F Company all the way to its 1st Platoon, which guarded the Namji-ri bridge. There, at the extreme right flank of the 25th Division, this platoon drove off a KPA force after a fierce fight. By September 2, E Company had destroyed most of a KPA battalion in heavy fighting.

Of all the 2nd Battalion units, G Company received the hardest blows. Before dawn of September 1, KPA troops had G Company platoons on separate hills under heavy assault. Shortly after 03:00 they overran the 3rd Platoon, Heavy Mortar Company, and drove it from its position. These mortarmen climbed Hill 179 (35.337°N 128.419°E) and on its crest joined the 2nd Platoon of G Company. Meanwhile, the 3rd Platoon of G Company, on a low hill along the Nam River 4 miles (6.4 km) from its juncture with the Naktong River, was also under close quarters attack. After daylight, Captain LeRoy E. Majeske, G Company commander, requested artillery concentrations and air strikes, but they were slow to come. At 11:45, the KPA had almost reached the crest of the hill, and only a narrow space separated the two forces. A few minutes later Majeske was killed, and Second lieutenant George Roach, commanding the 3rd Platoon, again reported the situation and asked for an air strike. The US Air Force delivered the strike on the KPA held side of the hill, and this checked the assaults. By this time many KPA troops had captured and occupied foxholes in the platoon position and from there threw grenades into other parts of the position. One of the grenades killed Roach early in the afternoon. Sergeant First Class Junius Poovey, a squad leader, now assumed command. By 18:00, Poovey had only 12 effective troops left in the platoon, 17 of the 29 men still living were wounded. With ammunition almost gone, Poovey requested and received authority to withdraw into the main G Company position. After dark, the 29 men, three of them carried on stretchers, withdrew, covered by the arrival of US tanks. The group reached the G Company position on Hill 179 at 23:30.

=== Stalemate ===
While G Company held its positions on Hill 179 on September 2 against KPA attack, 2nd Battalion, 27th Infantry started an attack northwest toward it at 17:00 from the Chung-ni area. The battalion made slow progress against formidable KPA forces. The night was extremely dark and the terrain along the Kuhe-ri ferry road was mountainous. After fighting throughout the night, the battalion reached a position south of the original defensive positions of G Company, 35th Infantry the next day at 15:00. A coordinated attack by US armor, artillery, air, and infantry got under way and by 18:00 the battalion had re-established the battle line. In this attack the 2nd Battalion, 27th Infantry, killed 275 KPA and recovered a large part of the equipment G Company had lost earlier.

The 2nd Battalion, 27th Infantry remained on the regained positions during the night of September 3. At 08:00 the next morning, G Company, 35th Infantry, relieved it on the regained positions and the 2-27th Infantry started its attack back up the supply road. While this was in progress, word came that the KPA had again driven G Company from its newly reestablished position. The 2-27th Infantry turned around, attacked, and once more restored the G Company positions. By 12:00 September 4, the 2-27th Infantry again turned over these positions to G Company and resumed its attack to the rear along the road in the gap between the 1st and 2nd Battalions, 35th Infantry. Almost immediately it was in contact with KPA forces. Soon KPA machine-guns were firing on the US troops from three directions. Torrential rains fell and observation became poor. By this time, the 2-27th Infantry was running short of ammunition. The commander ordered the battalion to withdraw 500 yards (460 m) to favorable terrain so that it could resupply.

Resupply proved to be a difficult task. The battalion had cleared the supply route two days previously in its attack to the G Company position but now it was closed again. The battalion commander requested air supply and the next morning, September 5, eight transport planes accomplished the resupply and the 2nd Battalion, 27th Infantry, was ready to resume its attack to the rear. By evening it had cleared the supply road and adjacent terrain of KPA penetration for a distance of 8,000 yards (7,300 m) to the rear of G Company's front-line positions. There the 2-27th Infantry received orders to halt and prepare to attack northeast to link up with the 1st Battalion, 27th Infantry.

=== US 3-27th Infantry moves up ===
After 2-27th Infantry had left the Chung-ni area on September 2 in its attack toward G Company, the KPA attacked the 24th Infantry command post and several artillery positions. To meet this new situation, Kean ordered the remaining battalion of the 27th Infantry, commanded by Lieutenant colonel George H. DeChow, to attack and destroy the KPA operating there.

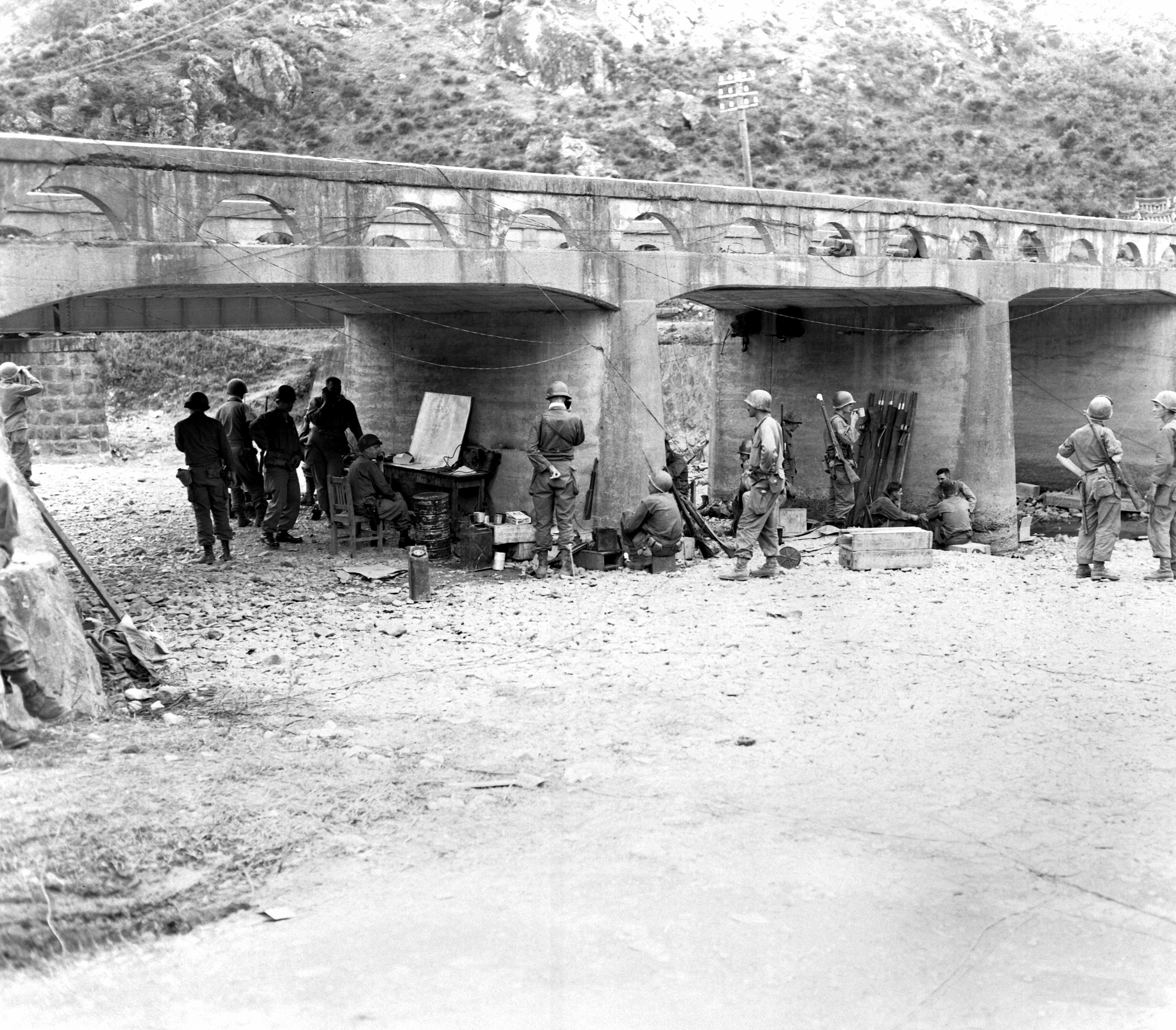
The 27th Infantry's command post beneath a bridge near Haman

After an early morning struggle on September 3 against several hundred KPA in the vicinity of the artillery positions, DeChow's battalion launched its attack at 15:00 over the high, rugged terrain west of the "Horseshoe" (35.267°N 128.467°E), as the deep curve in the Masan road was called, 4 miles (6.4 km) east of Komam-ni. Its mission was to seize and secure the high ground dominating the Horseshoe, and then relieve the pressure on the 24th Infantry's rear. Initially only one artillery piece was in position to support the attack. After the battalion advanced some distance, a KPA force, estimated to number more than 1,000 men, counterattacked it and inflicted heavy casualties, which included 13 officers. Additional US tanks moved up to help secure the exposed right flank and rear, and air strikes helped to contain the KPA force. The battalion finally succeeded in taking the high ground.

The next morning, September 4, instead of continuing the attack toward the 24th Infantry command post, 3rd Battalion, 27th Infantry was ordered to attack into the Komam-ni area where KPA troops were fighting in the US artillery positions. This attack got under way at 09:00 in the face of heavy small arms fire. In the afternoon, heavy rains slowed the attack, but after an all-day battle, I and K Companies, with the help of numerous air strikes, captured the high ground dominating the Komam-ni crossroads. Numerous casualties in the battalion had led Kean to attach C Company, 65th Engineer Combat Battalion, to it. The next day, September 5, the 3rd Battalion, 27th Infantry turned its attack across rugged terrain toward Haman and drove through to the vicinity of the 24th Infantry command post. In its attack, the 3rd Battalion counted more than 300 KPA dead in the area it traversed.

=== Artillery attacked ===
The series of events that caused Kean to change the direction of DeChow's attack toward Komam-ni began at 01:00, September 3. The 1st Battalion, 35th Infantry, protruded farther westward at this time than any other unit of the UN forces in Korea. Behind its positions on Sibidang-san the main supply route and rear areas were in KPA hands, and only in daylight and under escort could vehicles travel the road. On Sibidang-san the battalion had held its original positions after the heavy fighting of September 1, completely surrounded by barbed wire, booby traps, and flares, with all supporting weapons inside its tight perimeters. The battalion had the advantage of calling for protective artillery fire covering all approaches. An hour after midnight a KPA assault struck the battalion. The fight there continued until dawn September 3, when the 1st Battalion, 35th Infantry, counted 143 KPA dead in front of its positions, and on that basis estimated that the total KPA casualties must have been about 500 men. The 35th units also had the advantage of well-constructed strong points throughout the battle which the KPA could not penetrate.

In this night battle the 64th Field Artillery Battalion, supporting the 1st Battalion, became directly involved in the fighting. About 50 KPA infiltrated before dawn to A Battery's position and assaulted it. KPA employing submachine guns overran two artillery-machine-gun perimeter positions, penetrating to the artillery pieces at 03:00. There, Captain Andrew C. Anderson and his men fought in hand-to-hand combat with the KPA. Some of the guns fell temporarily into KPA hands but the artillerymen repulsed the attack, aided by the concentrations of fire from C Battery, 90th Field Artillery Battalion nearby, which cut off the KPA from reinforcements. In defending its guns in this night battle, A Battery lost seven men killed and 12 wounded.

Fighting in support of the Nam River front in the northern part of the 25th Division sector were five batteries of the 159th and 64th Field Artillery Battalions, firing 105 mm howitzers, and one battery of the 90th Field Artillery Battalion which fired 155 mm howitzers, for a total of 36 guns. One 155 mm howitzer fired from Komam-ni to the area north of Chungam-ni, the route for the KPA 6th Division's supplies. Another forward artillery piece kept the Iryong-ni bridge over the Nam under fire. The 25th Division artillery estimated it killed approximately 1,825 KPA soldiers during the first three days of September. In this critical time, the US Fifth Air Force added its firepower to that of the division artillery in support of the ground force. Eighth Army commander General Walton S. Walker attributed the UN victory in this sector directly to the extensive air support his division received in the battle.

=== North Koreans repulsed ===
Bitter, confused fighting continued behind the 35th Infantry's line for the next week. Battalions, companies, and platoons, cut off and isolated, fought independently of higher control and help except for airdrops which supplied many of them. Airdrops also supplied relief forces trying to reach the front-line units. Tanks and armored cars drove to the isolated units with supplies of food and ammunition and carried back critically wounded on the return trips. In general, the 35th Infantry fought in its original battle line positions, while at first one battalion, and later two battalions, of the 27th Infantry fought toward it through the estimated 3,000 KPA operating to its rear.

Although the 25th Division generally was under less pressure from KPA units after September 5, there were still severe local attacks. On September 6, 1st Battalion, 27th Infantry, moved north from the Haman area to join 2nd Battalion in the cleanup of KPA troops behind the 35th Infantry and below the Nam River. Caught between the 35th Infantry on its hill positions along the river and the attacking 27th Infantry units, large numbers of KPA were killed. Sixteen different groups reportedly were dispersed with heavy casualties during the day. By morning of September 7 there was clear evidence that survivors of the KPA 7th Division were trying to escape across the Nam River. However the KPA launched another attack against the 35th Infantry, which it quickly repulsed. The 25th Infantry Division buried more than 2,000 KPA dead, killed between September 1 and 7 behind its lines. This number did not include those killed in front of its positions.

Heavy rains caused the Nam and Naktong Rivers to rise on September 8 and 9, reducing the danger of new crossings. On September 8, after the 35th Infantry had been guarding it for a week, USAF F-82 Twin Mustangs mistakenly bombed the Namji-ri bridge over the Naktong and with one 500-pound (230 kg) bomb destroyed the 80 feet (24 m) center span. Only the bridges north of the junction of the Nam with the Naktong were supposed to be under aerial attack at this time. Some of the local commanders thought that had the KPA bypassed this bridge and crossed the Naktong farther east there would have been nothing between them and Pusan. However, KPA attacks against 2nd Battalion, 35th Infantry occurred nightly. The approaches to the bridge on the north side were mined. At one time there were about 100 KPA dead lying in that area. From September 9 to 16, there were limited attacks on the 35th Infantry's front but most of the KPA's momentum had been broken and they could not muster strong attacks against the regiment again.

=== North Korean withdrawal ===
The UN counterattack at Inchon outflanked the KPA and cut off all their main supply and reinforcement routes. On 16 September when the Eighth Army began its breakout from the Pusan Perimeter 25th Infantry Division was still fighting KPA forces behind its lines, and KPA strong points existed on the heights of Battle Mountain, P'il-bong, and Sobuk-san. Kean felt that the division could advance along the roads toward Chinju only when the mountainous center of the division front was clear. He therefore believed that the key to the advance of the 25th Division lay in its center where the KPA held the heights and kept the 24th Infantry Regiment under daily attack. The 27th Infantry on the left and the 35th Infantry on the right, astride the roads between Chinju and Masan held their positions and could not advance until the situation in front of the 24th Infantry improved.

On September 19 the UN discovered the KPA had abandoned of Battle Mountain during the night, and the 1st Battalion, 24th Infantry, moved up and occupied it. On the right, the 35th Infantry began moving forward. There was only light resistance until it reached the high ground in front of Chungam-ni where hidden KPA soldiers in spider holes shot at 1st Battalion soldiers from the rear. The next day the 1st Battalion captured Chungam-ni, and the 2nd Battalion captured the long ridge line running northwest from it to the Nam River. Meanwhile, the KPA still held strongly against the division left where the 27th Infantry had heavy fighting in trying to move forward.

The KPA withdrew from the Masan area the night of September 18–19. The KPA 7th Division withdrew from south of the Nam River while the 6th Division sideslipped elements to cover the entire front. Covered by the 6th Division, the 7th had crossed to the north side of the Nam River by the morning of September 19. Then the KPA 6th Division had withdrawn from its positions on Sobuk-san. The US units rapidly pursued them north, passing over the Battle Mountain positions, which were no longer of strategic importance.

== Aftermath ==
The 35th Infantry suffered 154 killed, 381 wounded, and two missing during the battle. The 27th Infantry lost a total of 118 killed, 382 wounded, and one captured during the Battle of Pusan Perimeter, however this included five killed and 54 wounded at the Battle of the Bowling Alley and around 150 casualties at the First Battle of Naktong Bulge. In support of the Nam River operations, the 64th Field Artillery Battalion suffered 16 killed, 27 wounded, one captured and five missing, the 159th Field Artillery Battalion lost 18 killed and 41 wounded, and the 90th Field Artillery Battalion 15 killed, 54 wounded and one missing. The regiment had performed so well in repulsing the KPA that Kean nominated it for a Presidential Unit Citation.

The KPA suffered heavily in the fight, most becoming casualties in the attack. By mid-September, the KPA 7th Division was reduced to just 4,000 men, a loss of 6,000 from when it was committed to the perimeter. Only 2,000 from the KPA 6th Division returned to North Korea, a loss of 80 percent of its strength. Large groups of troops from the divisions were captured as they attempted to return to North Korea, including up to 3,000 troops. The attacking force of over 20,000 had been reduced to only 6,000 by the end of the fights at Masan.

The fight at Masan remained a bitter stalemate during the entire six weeks of the Battle of Pusan Perimeter. Each side attempted several offensives on the other in an attempt to force a withdrawal, but the KPA were unable to pierce the UN perimeter, and the UN troops were unable to overwhelm the KPA to the point they were forced to withdraw. The battle itself was a tactical tie, since neither side could decisively defeat the other, however the UN units achieved their strategic goal of preventing the KPA from advancing further east and threatening Pusan. Instead, they were able to hold the line against repeated attacks until the Inchon attack and Pusan breakout, and were thus successful in defeating the KPA in subsequent engagements.

== Notes ==
- Alexander, Bevin (2003), Korea: The First War We Lost, Hippocrene Books, ISBN 978-0-7818-1019-7
- Appleman, Roy E. (1998), South to the Naktong, North to the Yalu: United States Army in the Korean War, Department of the Army, ISBN 978-0-16-001918-0, archived from the original on 2014-02-07 This article incorporates text from this source, which is in the public domain.
- Bowers, William T.; Hammong, William M.; MacGarrigle, George L. (2005), Black Soldier, White Army: The 24th Infantry Regiment in Korea, University Press of the Pacific, ISBN 978-1-4102-2467-5
- Catchpole, Brian (2001), The Korean War, Robinson Publishing, ISBN 978-1-84119-413-4
- Ecker, Richard E. (2004), Battles of the Korean War: A Chronology, with Unit-by-Unit United States Casualty Figures & Medal of Honor Citations, McFarland & Company, ISBN 978-0-7864-1980-7
- Fehrenbach, T.R. (2001), This Kind of War: The Classic Korean War History – Fiftieth Anniversary Edition, Potomac Books, ISBN 978-1-57488-334-3
- Millett, Allan R. (2000). The Korean War, Volume 1. Lincoln, Nebraska: University of Nebraska Press. ISBN 978-0-8032-7794-6.
- Varhola, Michael J. (2000), Fire and Ice: The Korean War, 1950–1953, Da Capo Press, ISBN 978-1-882810-44-4
