= Battle of Masan =

Battle in 1950 between United Nations Command (UN) and North Korean forces

- Part of the Battle of Pusan Perimeter
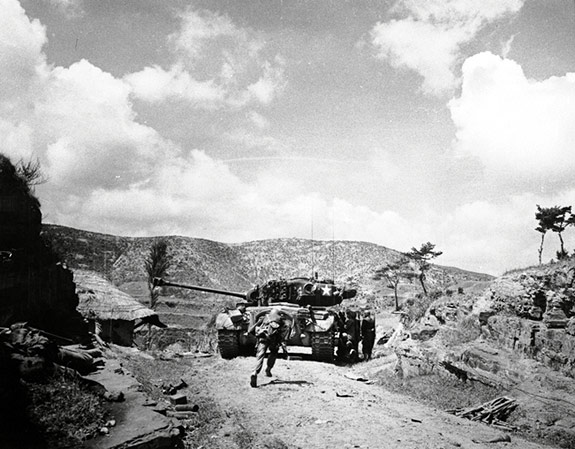
- American tanks advance west of Masan
Date	August 5 – September 19, 1950
Location	Masan, South Korea
Result	United Nations victory

Belligerents
United Nations: United States; South Korea	North Korea

Commanders and leaders
(United States) William B. Kean	Pang Ho San; Paek Nak Chil

Units involved
(United States) 25th Infantry Division: 24th Infantry Regiment; 27th Infantry Regiment; 35th Infantry Regiment; 5th Infantry RCT; (First Republic of Korea) ROK Marine Corps (First Republic of Korea) National Police	6th Division; 7th Division

Strength
~15,000	20,000

Casualties and losses
1,057 killed 3,085 wounded 20 missing	11,000 killed and deserted 3,000 captured

The Battle of Masan was an engagement between United Nations Command (UN) and North Korean forces, which took place early in the Korean War between August 5 and September 19, 1950, in the vicinity of Masan and the Naktong River in southeastern South Korea. It was part of the Battle of Pusan Perimeter, and was one of several large engagements fought simultaneously. The battle ended in a victory for the UN after large numbers of United States Army (US) troops were able to repel the repeated attacks of two Korean People's Army (KPA) divisions.

Operating as the extreme southern flank of the Pusan Perimeter, the US 25th Infantry Division placed its regiments around Masan, with the 24th Infantry Regiment and 5th Regimental Combat Team based in Haman and nearby Sobuk-san, and the 35th Infantry Regiment based along the Nam River to the west of the city. Throughout the six-week battle, the KPA 6th and 7th Divisions attacked the 25th Division's regiments in an attempt to break through the UN forces and attack Pusan.

An initial UN counteroffensive out of Masan proved ineffective in stopping the KPA from advancing. In the subsequent fight, the 35th Infantry was able to repel the KPA at the Battle of Nam River and were highly regarded for these actions. However, the 24th Infantry performed very poorly at the battles of Blue Mountain and Haman, forcing the 25th Division to muster reserves to counter the KPA gains against the 24th.

== Background ==
=== Outbreak of war ===
Following the 25 June 1950 invasion of South Korea by North Korea, the United Nations decided to commit troops to the conflict on behalf of South Korea. The United States subsequently committed ground forces to the Korean peninsula with the goal of fighting back the KPA invasion and preventing South Korea from collapsing. However, US forces in the Far East had been steadily decreasing since the end of World War II, five years earlier, and at the time the closest forces were the 24th Infantry Division, headquartered in Japan. The division was understrength, and most of its equipment was antiquated due to reductions in military spending. Regardless, the 24th Division was ordered to South Korea.

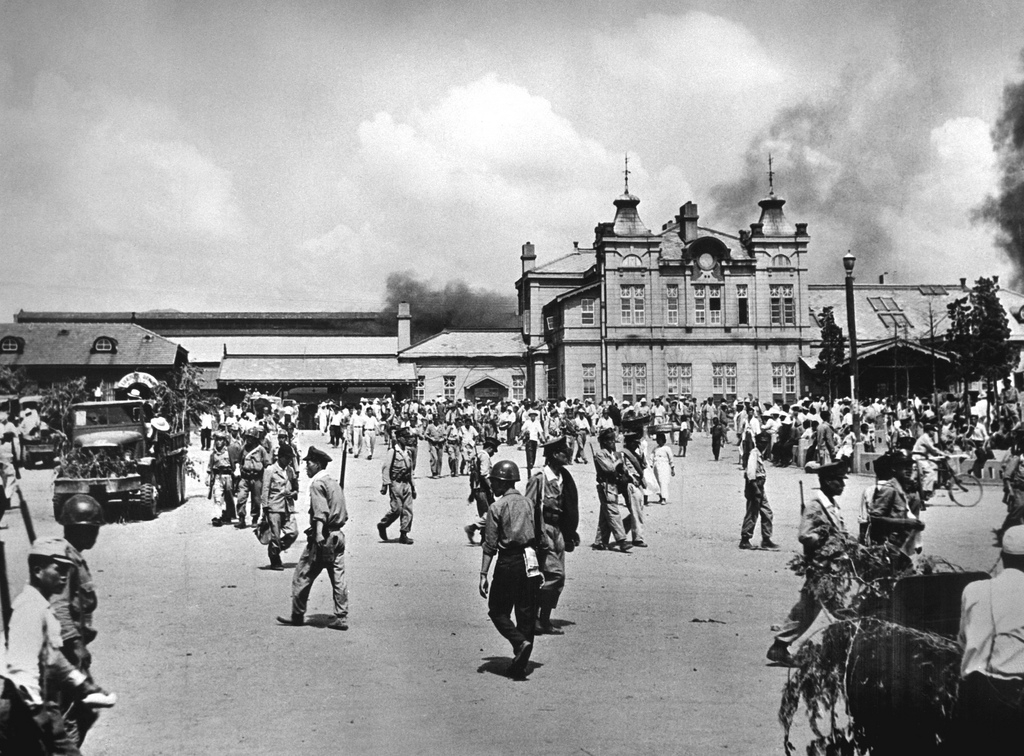
US forces retreat during the Battle of Taejon

The 24th Infantry Division was the first US unit sent into Korea with the mission to take the initial "shock" of KPA advances, delaying much larger KPA units to buy time to allow reinforcements to arrive. The division was alone for several weeks as it attempted to delay the KPA, making time for the 1st Cavalry and the 7th and 25th Infantry Divisions, along with other Eighth United States Army supporting units, to move into position. Advance elements of the 24th Infantry Division were badly defeated in the Battle of Osan on July 5, the first encounter with KPA forces. For the first month after that defeat, the 24th Infantry Division was repeatedly defeated and forced south by superior KPA numbers and equipment in engagements around Chochiwon, Chonan, and Pyongtaek. The division made a final stand in the Battle of Taejon, where it was nearly destroyed, but delayed KPA forces until July 20. By that time, the Eighth Army's force of combat troops were roughly equal to KPA forces attacking the region, with new UN units arriving every day.

=== North Korean advance ===
With Taejon captured, KPA forces began surrounding the Pusan Perimeter in an attempt to envelop it. The KPA 4th and 6th Infantry Divisions advanced south in a wide flanking maneuver. The two divisions attempted to envelop the UN's left flank, but became extremely spread out in the process. They advanced on UN positions with armor and superior numbers, repeatedly pushing back UN forces.

US forces finally halted the KPA advance in a series of engagements in the southern section of the country. Forces of the 3rd Battalion, 29th Infantry Regiment, newly arrived in the country, were wiped out at Hadong in a coordinated ambush by KPA forces on July 27, opening a pass to the Pusan area. Soon after, KPA forces took Chinju to the west, pushing back the US 19th Infantry Regiment and leaving routes to the Pusan open for more KPA attacks. US formations were subsequently able to defeat and push back the KPA on the flank in the Battle of the Notch on August 2. Suffering mounting losses, the KPA force in the west withdrew for several days to re-equip and receive reinforcements. This granted both sides a reprieve to prepare for the attack on the Pusan Perimeter.

== Battle ==
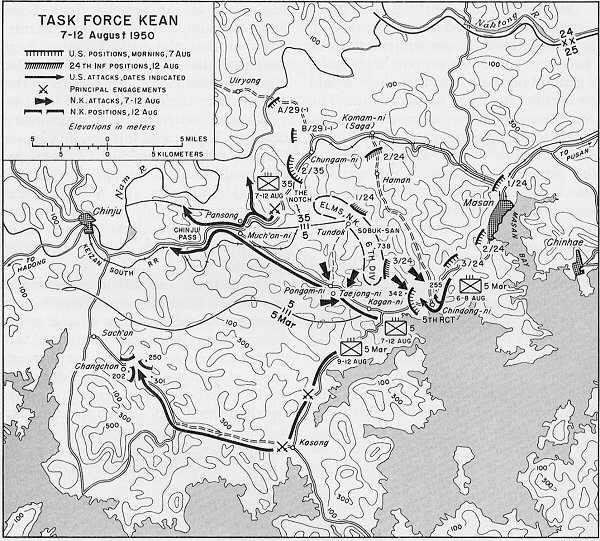
US and KPA movements around Masan during the Battle of Pusan Perimeter

=== Task Force Kean ===
Lieutenant General Walton Walker and the Eighth Army began preparing a counteroffensive, the first conducted by the UN in the war, for August. It would kick off with an attack by the US reserve units in the Masan area to secure Chinju from the KPA 6th Division, followed by a larger general push to the Kum River in the middle of the month. One of his goals was to break up a suspected massing of KPA troops near the Taegu area by forcing the diversion of some KPA units southward. On August 6, the Eighth Army issued the operational directive for the attack by Task Force Kean, named for the US 25th Infantry Division commander, Major General William B. Kean. Task Force Kean consisted of the 25th Division, less the 27th Infantry Regiment and a field artillery battalion, with the 5th Regimental Combat Team (5th RCT) and the 1st Provisional Marine Brigade attached. Together this represented a force of about 20,000 men. The plan of attack required the force to move west from positions held near Masan, seize the Chinju Pass, and secure the line as far as the Nam River. However, the offensive relied on the arrival of the entire 2nd Infantry Division, as well as three more battalions of American tanks.

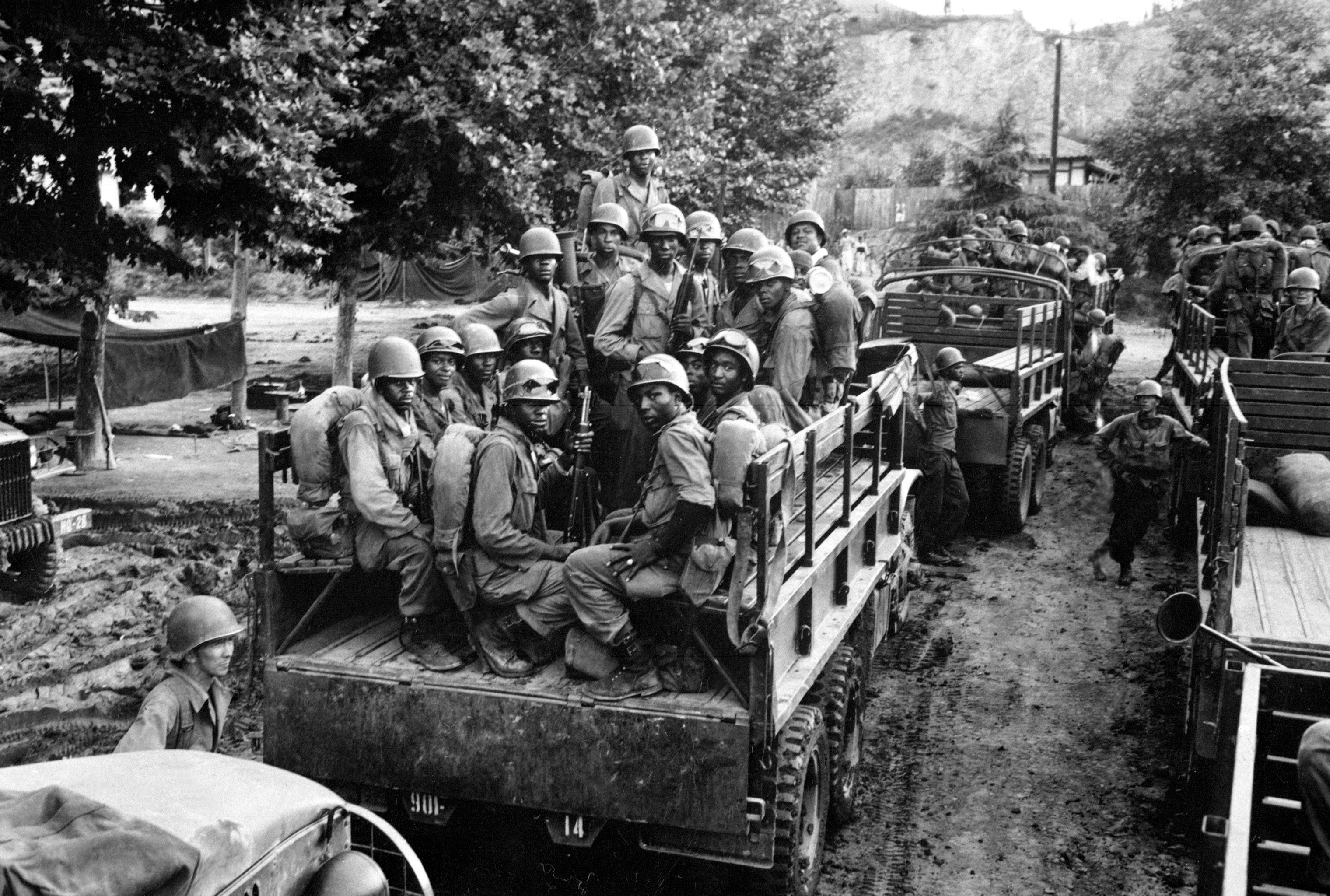
Troops of the 24th Infantry move to the Masan battleground

Task Force Kean kicked off its attack on August 7, moving out from Masan. At the Notch, a northern pass into the city and site of a previous battle, the 35th Infantry Regiment encountered 500 KPA infantry, defeating them. The force surged forward to Pansong, inflicting another 350 casualties on the KPA. There, they overran the KPA 6th Division's headquarters. However the rest of the task force was slowed by KPA resistance. Task Force Kean pressed on the Chindong-ni area, resulting in a confused battle where the fragmented force had to rely on air strikes and airdrops to keep it effective. Task Force Kean's offensive had collided with one being delivered simultaneously by the KPA 6th Division.

Heavy fighting continued in the area for three days. By August 9, Task Force Kean was poised to retake Chinju. The task force, aided by air power, initially advanced quickly though KPA resistance was heavy. On August 10 the Marines picked up the advance, inadvertently discovering the KPA 83rd Motorized Regiment of the 105th Armored Division. F4U Corsairs from the 1st Marine Air Wing strafed the retreating column repeatedly, inflicting 200 casualties and destroying about 100 of the regiment's equipment vehicles. However the 1st Provisional Marine Brigade elements were withdrawn from the force on August 12 to be redeployed elsewhere on the perimeter. Task Force Kean continued forward supported by naval and field artillery, capturing the area around Chondong-ni. However, Eighth Army requested several of its units to redeploy to Taegu to be used elsewhere on the front, particularly at the Naktong Bulge

An attempt to move the 25th Infantry Division's division trains through the valley became mired in the mud through the night of August 10–11 and was attacked in the morning by KPA who had driven American forces from the high ground. In the confusion, KPA armor was able to penetrate roadblocks and assault the supporting artillery positions. The surprise attack was successful in wiping out most of the 555th and 90th Field Artillery Battalions, with much of their equipment. Both KPA and US armor swarmed to the scene and US Marine aviation continued to provide air cover, but neither side was able to make appreciable gains despite inflicting heavy casualties on one another. US forces were unsuccessful in retaking the positions where the artillery was overrun, suffering numerous casualties in several failed attempts to do so. Upon later inspection, the bodies of 75 men, 55 from the 555th Field Artillery and 20 from the 90th Field Artillery, were found executed when the area again came under American control, in what was later known as the Bloody Gulch massacre. Task Force Kean was forced to withdraw back to Masan, unable to hold its gains, and by August 14 it was approximately in the same positions it had been in when it started the offensive.

Task Force Kean had failed in its objective of diverting North Korean troops from the north, and also failed in its objective of reaching the Chinju Pass. However, the offensive is noted to have significantly increased morale among the troops of the 25th Infantry Division, which performed extremely well in subsequent engagements. The KPA 6th Division had been reduced to 3,000–4,000 and had to replenish its ranks with South Korean conscripts from Andong. Fighting in the region continued for the rest of the month.

=== UN redraws battle lines ===
Walker then ordered the US 25th Infantry Division, under Kean, to take up defensive positions on the Pusan Perimeter southern flank west of Masan. By August 15, the 25th Infantry Division had moved into these positions. Rough terrain west of Masan limited the choice of the positions. The mountain group west of Masan was the first readily defensible ground east of the Chinju Pass. The 2,000-foot (610 m) mountain ridges of Sobuk-san dominated the area and protected the Komam-ni-Haman-Chindong-ni road, the only means of north-south communication west of Masan.

Northwest of Komam-ni (35.28°N 128.425°E) was the broken spur of P'il-bong, dominated by 900 feet (270 m) Sibidang-san, along the Nam River. Sibidang was an excellent observation point for the surrounding area, and US artillery emplaced in the Komam-ni area could interdict the road junction at Chungam-ni. The US 35th Infantry Regiment set up positions at Sibidang-Komam-ni, in the northern part of the 25th Infantry Division defense line. The 35th Regiment line extended from a point 2 miles (3.2 km) west of Komam-ni to the Nam River and then turned east along that stream to its confluence with the Naktong River. It was a long regimental line, about 26,000 yards (24,000 m), twice the length a regiment was typically assigned.

The 1st Battalion, 35th Infantry held the regiment's left flank west of Komam-ni, while the 2nd Battalion held the right along the Nam River. 3rd Battalion, redesignated from the 1st Battalion, 29th Infantry Regiment, was in reserve on the road south of Chirwon from where it could move quickly to any part of the line. To the south was the US 24th Infantry Regiment and west of Chindong-ni, the 5th Regimental Combat Team was on the division's left flank. On division orders, the 5th Regimental Combat Team first held the ground above the Chindong-ni coastal road only as far as Yaban-san. Kean soon decided, however, that the 5th RCT should close the gap northward between it and the 24th Infantry. When the 5th RCT sent a SROK unit of 100 men under American officers to the higher slope of Sobuk-san, KPA troops already there drove them back. Kean then ordered the 5th RCT to take this ground, but it was too late.

=== North Korean consolidation ===
Meanwhile, the KPA 6th Division was ordered to await reinforcements before continuing the attack. From north to south, the division had its 13th, 15th, and 14th Regiments. The first replacements arrived at Chinju on about August 12. Approximately 2,000 unarmed South Koreans conscripted in the Seoul area joined the division by August 15. At Chinju, the 6th Division issued them grenades and told the recruits they would have to pick up weapons from killed and wounded on the battlefield. Another group of 2,500 replacements conscripted in the Seoul area joined the 6th Division on August 21, bringing the division strength to approximately 8,500 men. In the last week of August and the first week of September, 3,000 more recruits conscripted in southwest Korea joined the division. The 6th Division used this last body of recruits in labor details at first and only later employed them as combat troops. The South Korean conscripts were often forcibly taken from their homes by KPA troops, and typically had very poor morale. The North Koreans realized they presented a weakness in the lines but were unable to acquire men using other means. The KPA placed rearguard troops behind the conscripts' formations, who would threaten to shoot them if they attempted to defect, desert or surrender their positions.

As a part of the KPA build-up in the south, the untried KPA 7th Division also arrived near Masan with another 10,000 men. The 7th Division occupied key ports to protect the 6th Division against possible amphibious landings in its rear. Eventually, though, the division was committed to combat in conjunction with other KPA units. The simultaneous attacks were hoped to overwhelm UN lines.

=== North Korean advance ===
On August 17, the KPA resumed their attack. A battalion of KPA troops drove the South Korean National Police out of T'ongyong but did not hold it long. UN naval forces heavily shelled T'ongyong as three companies of South Korean Marines from Koje Island made an amphibious landing near the town. The ROK force then attacked the KPA and, supported by naval gun fire, drove them out. The KPA at T'ongyong lost about 350 men, the survivors withdrew to Chinju.

The reinforced KPA had advanced on the 25th Infantry Division defensive line and had begun a series of probing attacks that were to continue throughout the month, sometimes of battalion strength. Most of these attacks came in the high mountains west of Haman, in the Battle Mountain, P'il-bong, and Sobuk-san area. There the 6th Division attacked any UN-held terrain features that afforded observation of its supply and concentration area in the deeply cut valley to the west.

=== Battle of Komam-ni ===
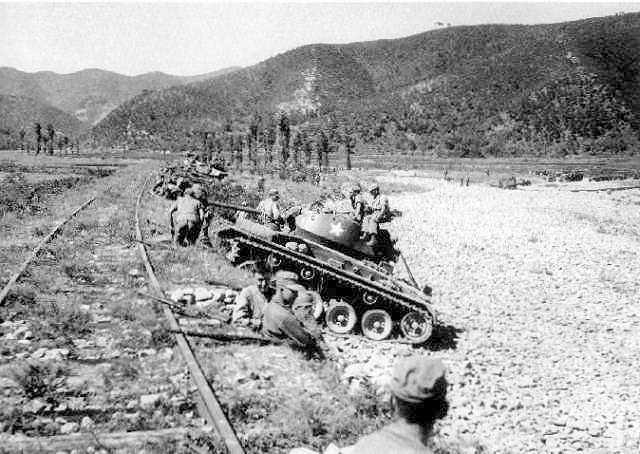
M24 Chaffee light tanks wait for a North Korean attack near Masan

The KPA 6th Division shifted its axis of attack and its main attacking effort to the northern part of the Chinju-Masan corridor just below the Nam River in the 35th Infantry's sector. The 35th Infantry set to work to cover its front with trip flares, but they were in short supply and gradually it became impossible to replace them. Illuminating flares were also in short supply, and the reserve stocks had deteriorated to such a degree that only about 20 percent of the supply issued to the regiment was effective. Even when employed, the time lapse between a request for them and delivery by the big howitzers allowed some KPA infiltration before the threatened area was illuminated.

The 64th Field Artillery Battalion, with C Battery, 90th Field Artillery Battalion, attached, and A Company, 89th Medium Tank Battalion, supported the regiment. Three M4A3 Sherman tanks, from positions at Komam-ni, acted as artillery and placed interdiction fire on Chungam-ni. Six other M26 Pershing tanks in a similar manner placed interdiction fire on Uiryong across the Nam River.

In the pre-dawn hours of August 17, a KPA attack hit the 35th Infantry. KPA artillery fire began falling on the 1st Battalion command post in Komam-ni at 03:00, and an hour later KPA infantry attacked A Company, forcing two of its platoons from their positions, and overrunning a mortar position. After daylight, a counterattack by B Company regained the lost ground. This was the beginning of a five-day battle by 1st Battalion along the southern spurs of Sibidang, 2 miles (3.2 km) west of Komam-ni. The KPA attempted to turn the left flank of the 35th Regiment and split the 25th Division line. On the morning of August 18, A Company again lost its position to KPA attack and again regained it by counterattack. Two companies of South Korean police arrived to reinforce the battalion right flank. Against the continuing KPA attack, artillery supporting the 1st Battalion fired an average of 200 rounds an hour during the night of August 19–20.

After three days and nights of this battle, C Company, 35th Infantry and A Company, 29th Infantry moved up astride the Komam-ni road during the morning of August 20 to bolster A and B Companies on Sibidang. A large concentration of KPA advanced to renew the attack. The US troops directed artillery fire on this force and called in an air strike. Observers estimated that the artillery fire and the air strike killed about 350 KPA troops, half the attack group.

The KPA made another try on the same position. The morning of August 22, KPA infantry started a very heavy attack against the 1st Battalion. Employing no artillery or mortar preparatory fires, the force cut the barbed wire at the perimeter and attacked at close quarters with small arms and grenades. This assault engaged three American companies and drove one of them from its position. After three hours of fighting A Company counterattacked at 07:00 and regained its lost position. The next day, August 23, the KPA, frustrated in this area, withdrew from contact in the 35th Infantry sector.

=== Battle of Battle Mountain ===
This high ground west of Haman on which the 24th Infantry established its defensive line was part of the Sobuk-san mountain mass. Sobuk-san reaches its 2,400-foot (730 m) peak at P'il-bong (also called Hill 743) (35.1687°N 128.4196°E) 8 miles (13 km) northwest of Chindong-ni and 3 miles (4.8 km) southwest of Haman. From P'il-bong the crest of the ridge line curves northwestward, to rise again 1 mile (1.6 km) away in the bald peak designated Hill 665 (35.1795°N 128.408°E), which became known as Battle Mountain. US troops also occasionally referred to it variously as "Napalm Hill," "Old Baldy," or "Bloody Knob." Between P'il-bong and Battle Mountain the ridge line narrows to a rocky ledge which the troops called the "Rocky Crags." Northward from Battle Mountain toward the Nam River, the ground drops sharply in two long spur ridges. Men who fought there called the eastern one Green Peak.

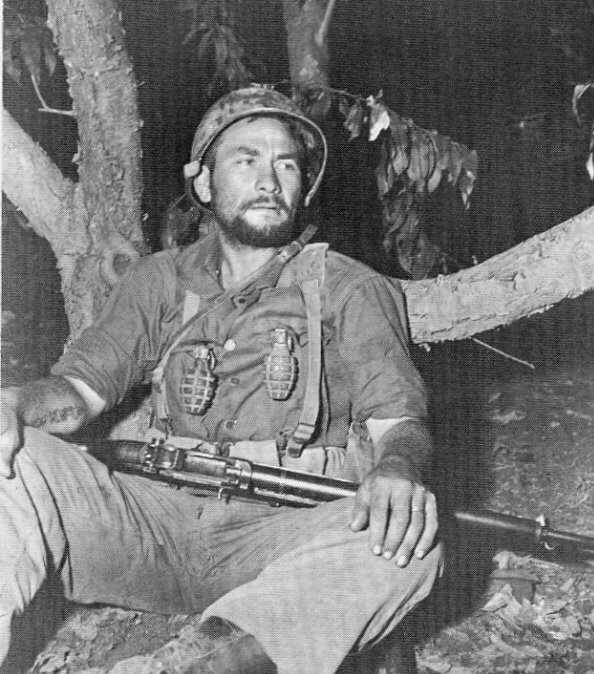
An exhausted soldier of the 5th RCT rests after 31 days in combat at Masan.

At the western, KPA-held base of Battle Mountain and P'il-bong were the villages of Ogok and Tundok, 1.25 miles (2.01 km) from the crest. A north-south mountain trail crossed a high saddle just north of these villages and up the west slope about halfway to the top of Battle Mountain. This road gave the KPA an advantage in mounting and supplying their attacks in the area. A trail system ran from Ogok and Tundok to the crests of Battle Mountain and P'il-bong. From the top of Battle Mountain an observer could look directly down into the KPA-held valley. At the same time, from Battle Mountain the KPA could look down into the Haman valley eastward and observe the US 24th Infantry command post, supply road, artillery positions, and approach trails. Whichever side held the crest of Battle Mountain could see into the rear areas of the other. Both forces, seeing the advantages of holding the crest of Battle Mountain, fought relentlessly to capture it in a six-week-long battle.

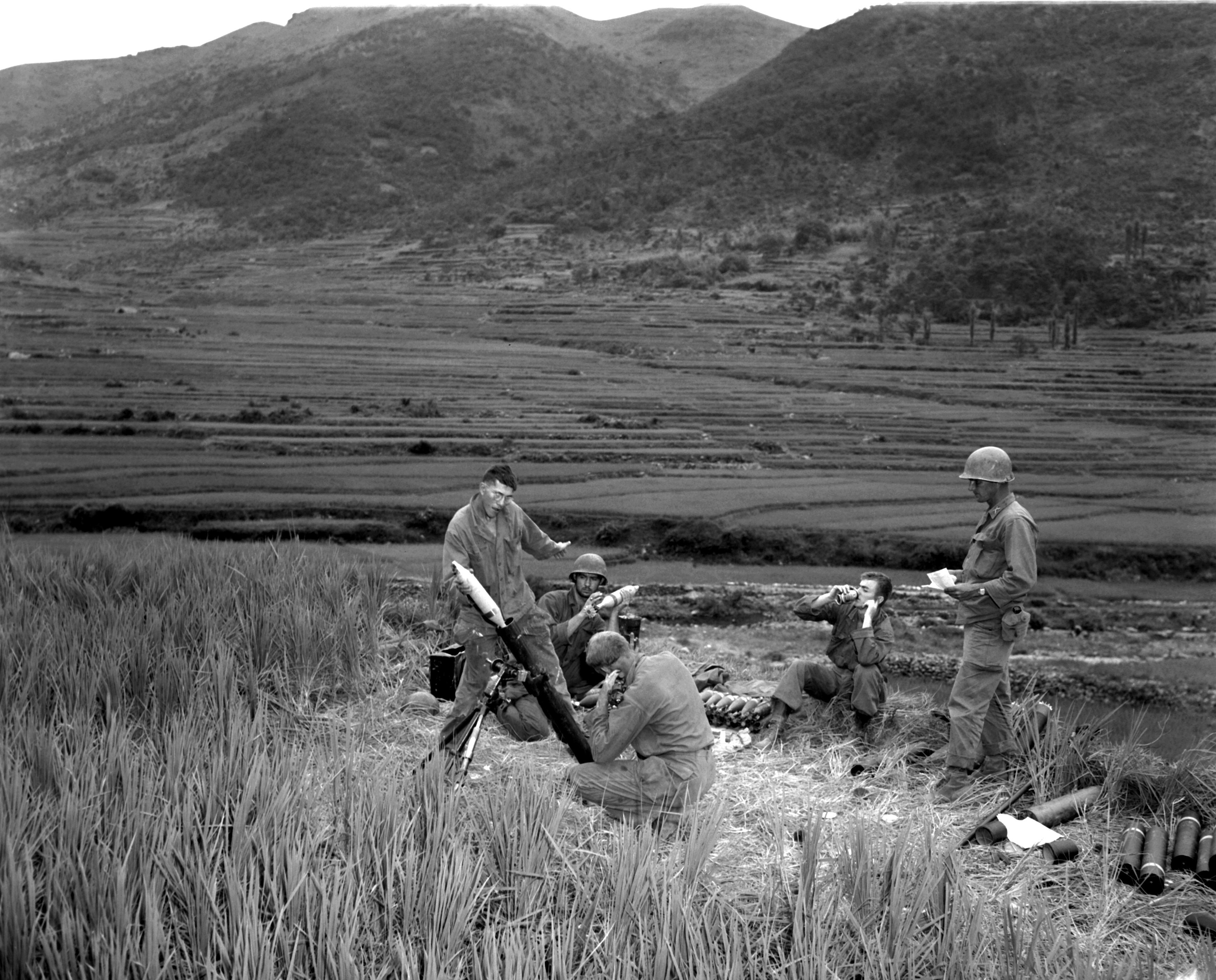
US 5th Infantry troops man a mortar west of Masan

The first attack against the mountain line of the 24th Infantry came on the morning of August 18, when the KPA overran several E Company positions on the northern spur of Battle Mountain and killed the company commander. During the day, Lieutenant colonel Paul F. Roberts succeeded Lieutenant colonel George R. Cole in command of the 2nd Battalion, 24th Infantry there. The next day, the KPA attacked C Company on Battle Mountain and routed it. Officers could collect only 40 men to bring them back into position. Many ROK police on P'il-bong also ran from the fight, and only 56 of them remained in their defensive positions. American officers used threats and physical force to get others back into position. A 1 mile (1.6 km) in the line north of P'il-bong existed in the 24th Infantry lines at the close of the day, and an unknown number of KPA were moving into it.

On August 20, the KPA 6th Division intensified its efforts to attack Battle Mountain, and began sending stronger attacks to capture the two peaks. In the face of these, all of C Company except the company commander and about 25 men abandoned their position on Battle Mountain. Upon reaching the bottom of the mountain those who had fled reported erroneously that the company commander had been killed and their position surrounded, then overrun by the KPA. On the basis of this misinformation, American artillery and mortars fired concentrations on C Company's former position, and fighter-bombers, in 38 sorties, attacked the crest of Battle Mountain, using napalm, fragmentation bombs, rockets and machine guns. This action forced the company commander and his remaining 25 men off Battle Mountain after they had held it for 20 hours, having declined a call to surrender from the KPA. A platoon of E Company, except for about 10 men, also left its position on the mountain as soon as the attack progressed. On the regimental left, an ROK patrol from K Company's position on Sobuk-san captured the commanding officer of the KPA 15th Regiment, but he was killed a few minutes later while trying to escape. The patrol removed several intelligence documents from his body. During the day of fighting on Battle Mountain and P'il-bong, the KPA drove off the ROK police from the 24th Infantry's left flank on Sobuk-san. 24th Infantry troops continued to straggle from their positions, ignoring commands from officers to stay in place. Both African-American and white officers, infuriated by the disobedience, wrote sworn statements implicating the deserters. The situation was so severe that those who stayed in their positions were often given Bronze Star Medals with Valor Devices because they were so far outnumbered in the fighting.

Battle Mountain changed hands so often during August that there is no agreement on the exact number of times. The intelligence sergeant of the 1st Battalion, 24th Infantry estimated the peak changed hands 19 times. From August 18 to the end of the month, KPA troops attacked the mountain every night. The peak often changed hands two or three times in a 24-hour period. The usual pattern was for the KPA to take it at night and the US 24th Infantry to recapture it the next day. This type of fluctuating battle resulted in relatively high losses among artillery forward observers and their equipment. During the period of August 15–31, seven forward observers and eight other members of the Observer and Liaison Section of the 159th Field Artillery Battalion were casualties, and they lost eight radios, 11 telephones, and two vehicles in the process.

The 24th Infantry consistently captured Battle Mountain in the same way. Artillery, mortar, and tank fire raked the crest and air strikes employing napalm blanketed the top of the peak. Then, the infantry attacked from the hill beneath the east slope of the summit. Supporting mortars would set up a base of fire and kept the heights under barrage until the infantry had arrived at a point just short of the crest. The mortar fire then lifted and the infantry moved rapidly up the last stretch to the top, usually to find it abandoned by the KPA.

=== September push ===
On August 31, 1950, the 25th Division held a front of almost 30 miles (48 km), beginning in the north at the Namji-ri bridge over the Naktong River and extending west on the hills south of the river to the Nam's confluence with it. It then bent southwest up the south side of the Nam to where the Sobuk-san mountain mass tapered down in its northern extremity to the river. There the line turned south along rising ground to Sibidang-san, crossed the saddle on its south face through which passed the Chinju-Masan railroad and highway, and continued southward up to Battle Mountain and on to P'il-bong. From P'il-bong the line dropped down spur ridge lines to the southern coastal road near Chindong-ni. The US 35th Infantry Regiment held the northern 26,000 yards (24,000 m) of the division line, from the Namji-ri bridge to the Chinju-Masan highway. The regiment was responsible for the highway. The regiment's weakest and most vulnerable point was a 3-mile (4.8 km) gap along the Naktong River between most of F Company on the west and its 1st Platoon to the east. This platoon guarded the Namji-ri cantilever steel bridge on the division extreme right at the boundary with the US 2nd Infantry Division across the Naktong River. South of the highway, the 24th Infantry held the high ground west of Haman, including Battle Mountain and P'il-bong. Colonel John L. Throckmorton's 5th RCT held the southern spur of Sobuk-san to the coastal road at Chindong-ni. From Chindong-ni some ROK Marine units continued the line to the southern coast. Kean's 25th Division command post was at Masan, the 35th Infantry command post was on the east side of the Chirwon-Chung-ni road, the 24th Infantry command post was at Haman and Throckmorton's 5th Infantry command post was at Chindong-ni. By August 31, the division was suffering manpower shortages, and a limited number of KATUSAs were brought in to replenish its ranks.

Aerial reconnaissance in the last week of August had disclosed to Eighth Army a large amount of KPA activity behind the lines opposite the US 2nd and 25th Divisions in the southern part of the Pusan Perimeter. The KPA had built three new underwater bridges across the Nam River in front of the 35th Infantry in the 25th Division sector. Aerial bombing only temporarily and partially destroyed these bridges, and they were repaired overnight. Eighth Army intelligence credited the KPA with having moved one or two new divisions and about 20 tanks to the Hyopch'on area on the west side of the Naktong River opposite the US 2nd Division. However, US intelligence overestimated the strength of these divisions. On August 28 the Eighth Army intelligence officer warned that a general offensive may be expected at any time along the 2nd Division and 25th Division front aimed at severing the Taegu-Pusan railroad and highway and capturing Masan.

Just before midnight August 31, KPA I Corps started its portion of The Great Naktong Offensive, a coordinated attack all along the Pusan Perimeter with a goal of breaking the UN defensive lines and capturing Pusan. KPA soldiers crossed the lower Naktong at a number of points in a well-planned attack. From Hyongp'ung southward to the coast, in the zones of the US 2nd and 25th Divisions, the KPA's greatest effort struck in a single massive coordinated attack.

=== Battle of Haman ===
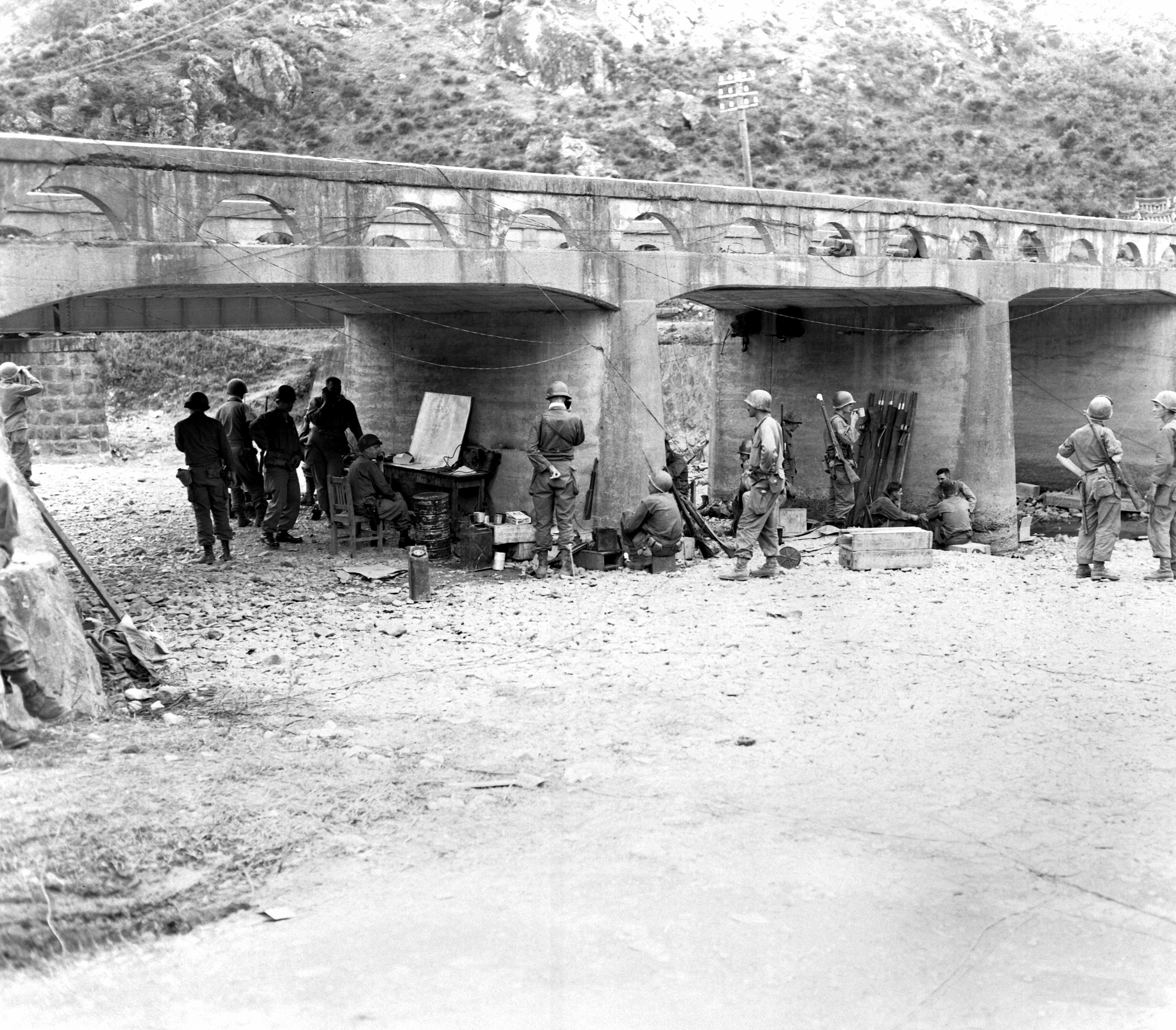
The 27th Infantry's command post beneath a bridge near Haman.

In the left center of the 25th Division line, Lieutenant colonel Paul F. Roberts' 2nd Battalion, 24th Infantry, held the crest of the second ridge west of Haman, 1 mile (1.6 km) from the town. From Chungam-ni, in KPA territory, a secondary road led to Haman along the shoulders of low hills and across rice paddy ground, running east 1 mile (1.6 km) south of the main Chinju-Masan road. It came through Roberts' 2nd Battalion position in a pass 1 mile (1.6 km) west of Haman. Late in the afternoon of August 31, observers with G Company, 24th Infantry, noticed activity 1 mile (1.6 km) in front of their positions. They called in two air strikes that hit this area at dusk. US artillery sent a large concentration of fire into the area, but the effect of this fire was not known. All US units on the line were alerted for a possible KPA attack.

That night the KPA launched The Great Naktong Offensive against the entire UN force. The KPA 6th Division advanced first, hitting F Company on the north side of the pass on the Chungam-ni-Haman road. The ROKA troops in the pass left their positions and fell back on G Company to the south. The KPA captured a 75 mm recoilless rifle in the pass and turned it on US tanks, knocking out two of them. They then overran a section of 82 mm mortars at the east end of the pass. South of the pass, at dawn, First lieutenant Houston M. McMurray found that only 15 out of 69 men assigned to his platoon remained with him, a mix of US and ROK troops. The KPA attacked this position at dawn. They came through an opening in the barbed wire perimeter which was supposed to be covered by a man with a M1918 Browning Automatic Rifle, but he had fled. Throwing grenades and spraying the area with PPSh-41 "burp gun" fire, the KPA quickly overran the position. Numerous officers and non-commissioned officers attempted to get the men back into line, but they would not follow these orders. In one instance ROKA troops killed their own company commander when he tried to stop them from escaping.

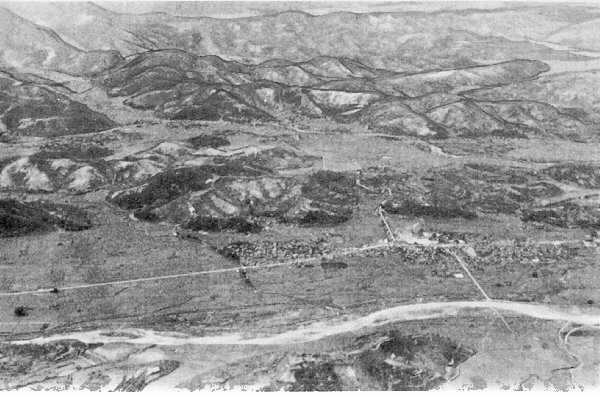
Haman in 1950. The 24th Infantry positions were on the ridges to the west (left) of the town.

Shortly after the KPA attack started most of the 2nd Battalion, 24th Infantry, fled its positions. One company at a time, the battalion was struck with strong attacks all along its front, and with the exception of a few dozen men in each company, each formation quickly crumbled, with most of the troops running back to Haman against the orders of the officers. The KPA passed through the crumbling US lines quickly and overran the 2nd Battalion command post, killing several men there and destroying much of the battalion's equipment. With the 2nd Battalion broken, Haman was open to direct attack. As the KPA encircled Haman, Roberts ordered an officer to take remnants of the battalion and establish a roadblock at the south edge of the town. Although the officer directed a large group of men to accompany him, only eight did so. The 2nd Battalion was no longer an effective fighting force. Pockets of its soldiers remained in place and fought fiercely, but the majority fled upon attack, and the KPA were able to move around the uneven resistance. They surrounded Haman as the 2nd Battalion crumbled in disarray.

When the KPA attack broke through the 2nd Battalion, the 1st Battalion commander ordered his unit, which was about 3 miles (4.8 km) south of Haman on the Chindong-ni road, to counterattack and restore the line. Roberts assembled all the 40 men of the disorganized 2nd Battalion he could find to join in this counterattack, which got under way at 07:30. Upon contact with the KPA, the 1st Battalion broke and fled to the rear. Thus, shortly after daylight the scattered and disorganized men of the 1st and 2nd Battalions, 24th Infantry had fled to the high ground 2 miles (3.2 km) east of Haman. The better part of two regiments of the KPA 6th Division poured into and through the Haman gap, now that they had captured the town and held it.

At 14:45 on September 1, Kean ordered an immediate counterattack to restore the 24th Infantry positions. For 30 minutes USAF aircraft struck KPA positions around Haman with bombs, napalm, rockets, and machine gun fire. They also attacked the KPA-held ridges around the town. Fifteen minutes of concentrated artillery fire followed. Fires spread in Haman. Infantry from 3rd Battalion moved out in attack west at 16:30, reinforced by a platoon of tanks from A Company, 79th Tank Battalion. Eight tanks, mounting infantry, spearheaded the attack into Haman, capturing the city easily, as most of the KPA troops had abandoned it. KPA in force held the ridge on the west side of the town, and their machine gun fire swept every approach, destroying one tank and the attacking infantry suffered heavy casualties. But the battalion pressed the attack and by 18:25 had seized the first long ridge 500 yards (460 m) west of Haman. By 20:00 it had secured half of the old battle position on the higher ridge beyond, 1 mile (1.6 km) west of Haman. Just 200 yards (180 m) short of the crest on the remainder of the ridge, the infantry dug in for the night. It had recaptured Haman and was pushing back to the 24th's old positions.

The KPA attacked Haman daily for the next week. Following the repelling of KPA infiltration on September 7, the attack on Haman ground to a halt. The KPA, racked by logistical and manpower shortages, focused more heavily on their attacks against 24th Infantry positions on Battle Mountain, as well as 35th Infantry positions at the Nam River. 24th Infantry troops at Haman encountered only probing attacks until September 18.

=== Battle of Nam River ===
Meanwhile, the KPA 7th Division troops committed all of their effort into attacking the US 35th Infantry line. At 23:30 on August 31, a KPA SU-76 self-propelled gun from across the Nam fired shells into the position of G Company, 35th Infantry, overlooking the river. Within a few minutes, KPA artillery was attacking all front-line rifle companies of the regiment from the Namji-ri bridge west. Under cover of this fire a reinforced regiment of the KPA 7th Division crossed the Nam River and attacked F and G Companies, 35th Infantry. Other KPA soldiers crossed the Nam on an underwater bridge in front of the paddy ground north of Komam-ni and near the boundary between the 2nd Battalion, led by Lieutenant colonel John L. Wilkins, Jr., holding the river front and Lieutenant colonel Bernard G. Teeter's 1st Battalion holding the hill line that stretched from the Nam River to Sibidang-san and the Chinju-Masan highway. The 35th Infantry, facing shortages of equipment and reinforcements, was under-equipped but nonetheless prepared for an attack.

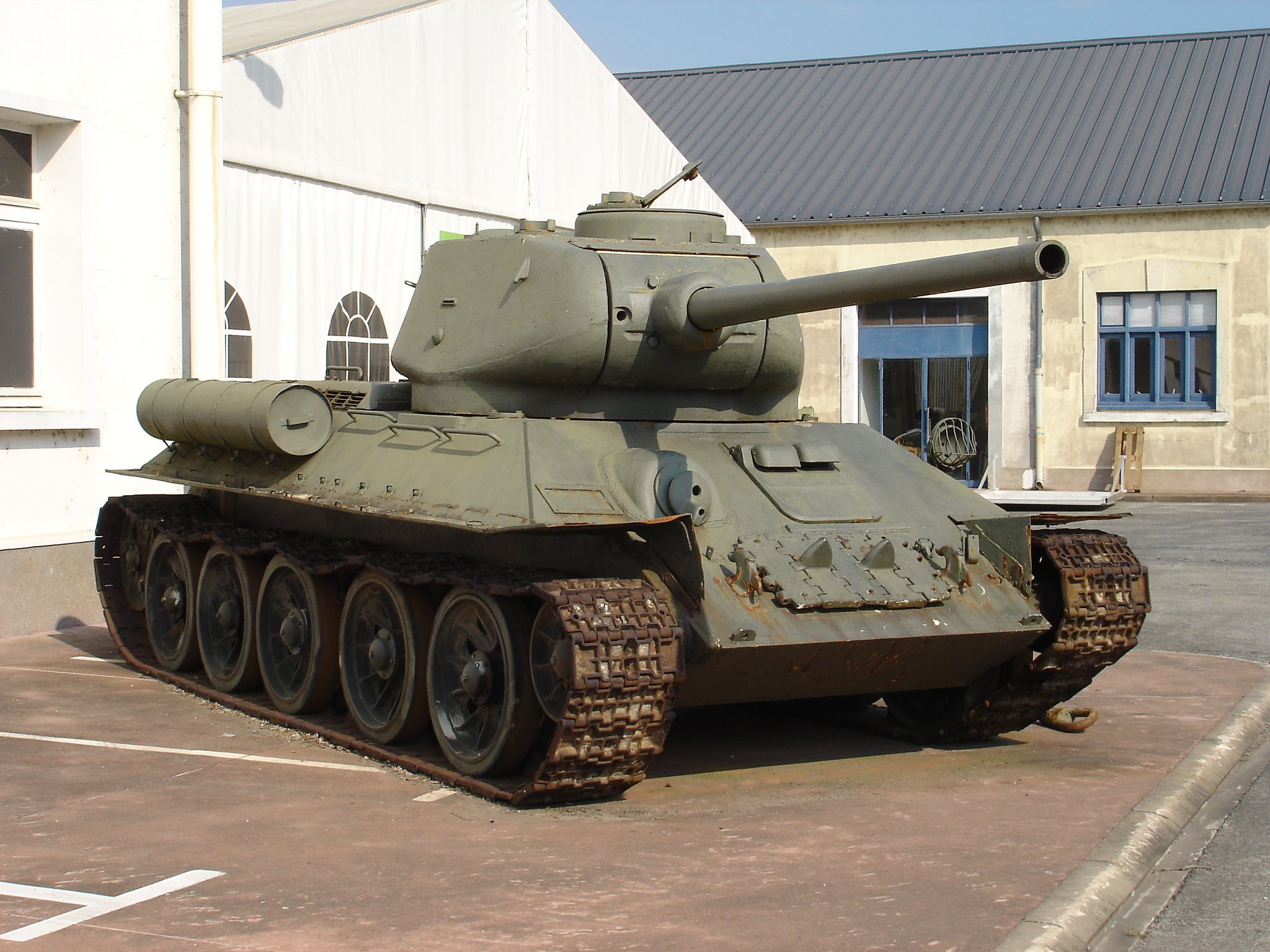
T-34 tanks, such as this one, were the standard armor used by the North Korean Army in 1950 and were also present at Masan

In the low ground between these two battalions at the river ferry crossing site, the 35th Infantry commander had placed 300 ROK Police, expecting them to hold there long enough to serve as a warning for the rest of the forces. Guns from the flanking hills there could cover the low ground with fire. Back at Komam-ni he held the 3rd Battalion ready for use in counterattack to stop a KPA penetration should it occur. Unexpectedly, the ROK police companies near the ferry scattered at the first KPA fire. At 00:30, KPA troops streamed through this hole in the line, some turning left to take G Company in its flank and rear, and others turned right to attack C Company, which was on a spur of ground west of the Komam-ni road. The I&R Platoon and elements of C and D Companies formed a defense line along the dike at the north edge of Komam-ni where US tanks joined them at daybreak. But the KPA did not drive for the Komam-ni road fork 4 miles (6.4 km) south of the river as Colonel Fisher expected them to; instead, they turned east into the hills behind 2nd Battalion.

At daybreak on September 1, a tank-led relief force of C Company headquarters troops cleared the road to Sibidang-san and resupplied the 2nd Platoon, B Company, with ammunition just in time for it to repel another KPA assault, killing 77 and capturing 21. Although Fisher's 35th Infantry held all its original positions, except that of the forward platoon of G Company, 3,000 KPA soldiers were behind its lines. The farthest eastern penetration reached the high ground just south of Chirwon overlooking the north-south road there.

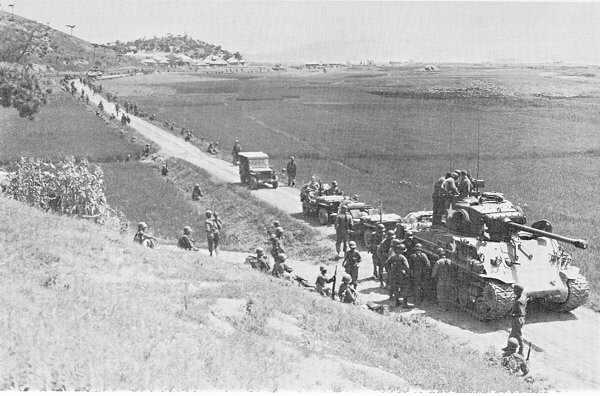
Troops of the 2nd Battalion, 27th Infantry traverse the recaptured Engineer Road.

By midafternoon, Kean felt that the situation was so dangerous that he ordered the 2nd Battalion, 27th Infantry Regiment, to attack behind the 35th Infantry. A large part of the division artillery was under direct KPA infantry attack. During the morning hours of September 1, when the KPA 7th Division troops had attacked, the first American unit they encountered was G Company, 35th Infantry, at the north shoulder of the gap. While some KPA units peeled off to attack G Company, others continued on and engaged E Company, 2 miles (3.2 km) downstream from it, and still others attacked scattered units of F Company all the way to its 1st Platoon, which guarded the Namji-ri bridge. There, at the extreme right flank of the 25th Division, this platoon drove off a KPA force after a fierce fight. By September 2, E Company in a heavy battle had destroyed most of a KPA battalion.

Bitter, confused fighting continued behind the 35th Infantry's line for the next week. Battalions, companies, and platoons, cut off and isolated, fought independently of higher control and help except for airdrops which supplied many of them. Airdrops also supplied relief forces trying to reach the front-line units. Tanks and armored cars drove to the isolated units with supplies of food and ammunition and carried back critically wounded on the return trips. In general, the 35th Infantry fought in its original battle line positions, while at first one battalion, and later two battalions, of the 27th Infantry fought toward it through the estimated 3,000 KPA operating in its rear areas.

Although the 25th Division generally was under much less pressure after September 5, there were still severe local attacks. Heavy rains caused the Nam and Naktong Rivers to rise on September 8 and 9, reducing the danger of new crossings. However, KPA attacks against 2nd Battalion, 35th Infantry occurred nightly. The approaches to the Namji-ri bridge, one of their key targets to protect, were mined. At one time there were about 100 KPA dead lying in that area. From September 9 to 16, there were limited attacks on the 35th Infantry's front, but most of the KPA momentum had been broken and they could not muster strong attacks against the regiment again.

=== Evacuation of Masan ===
Civilians in Masan posed an unexpectedly dangerous problem for the UN forces. The town had a large community of Communist sympathizers and agents. At the peak of the KPA offensive, Han Gum Jo, manager of the Masan branch of the Korean Press Association, confessed that he was chief of the South Korean Labor Party in Masan and that he had been funneling information to the KPA through a Pusan headquarters. Additionally, the chief of the Masan prison guards was found to be the head of a Communist cell that included seven of his subordinates. This, and other counterintelligence information, came to light at a time when the most intense fighting was in progress only a few miles away. Kean considered the situation so dangerous that he ordered Masan evacuated of all people except police, public officials, railroad and utility workers, and necessary laborers and their families. Evacuation was to be completed in five days. On September 10 and 11 alone the 25th Division evacuated more than 12,000 people by Landing Ship Tank (LST) from Masan.

=== North Korean withdrawal ===
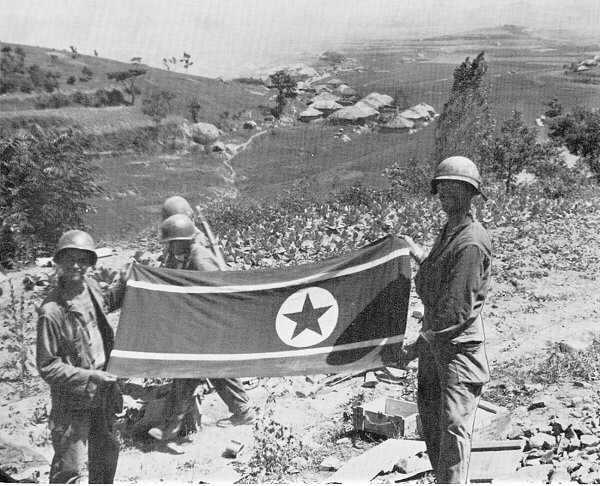
Troops of the US 35th Infantry display a North Korean flag captured along the Nam River.

The UN counterattack at Inchon collapsed the KPA rear and forced them back on all fronts. On September 16 the Eighth Army began its breakout from the Pusan Perimeter however, the 25th Infantry Division was still fighting KPA forces behind its lines, and KPA strongpoints existed on the heights of Battle Mountain, P'il-bong, and Sobuk-san. Kean felt that the division could advance along the roads toward Chinju only when the mountainous center of the division front was clear. He therefore believed that the key to the advance of the 25th Division lay in its center where the KPA held the heights and kept the 24th Infantry Regiment under daily attack. The 27th Infantry on the left and the 35th Infantry on the right, astride the roads between Chinju and Masan held their positions and could not advance until the situation in front of the 24th Infantry improved.

On September 19 the UN discovered the KPA had abandoned Battle Mountain during the night, and the 1st Battalion, 24th Infantry, moved up and occupied it. On the right, the 35th Infantry began moving forward. There was only light resistance until it reached the high ground in front of Chungam-ni where hidden KPA soldiers in spider holes shot at 1st Battalion soldiers from the rear. The next day the 1st Battalion captured Chungam-ni, and the 2nd Battalion captured the long ridge line running northwest from it to the Nam River. Meanwhile, the KPA still held strongly against the division left where the 27th Infantry had heavy fighting in trying to move forward.

The KPA withdrew from the Masan area the night of September 18–19. The KPA 7th Division withdrew from south of the Nam River while the 6th Division sideslipped elements to cover the entire front. Covered by the 6th Division, the 7th had crossed to the north side of the Nam River by the morning of September 19. Then the KPA 6th Division withdrew from its positions on Sobuk-san. The US units rapidly pursued them north, passing over the Battle Mountain positions, which were no longer of strategic importance.

== Aftermath ==
The US 5th Regimental Combat Team suffered 269 killed, 573 wounded and 4 missing during its battles at the Pusan Perimeter, most of these at Masan. The rest of the 25th Infantry Division suffered 650 killed, 1,866 wounded, four captured and 10 missing during the fight. Another 138 were killed, 646 wounded, and two captured during the division's breakout attack from the Masan battleground.

The KPA suffered heavily in the fight, and most became casualties in the attack. By mid-September, the KPA 7th Division was reduced to just 4,000 men, a loss of 6,000 from when it was committed to the perimeter. Only 2,000 men from the KPA 6th Division returned to North Korea, a loss of 80 percent of its strength. Large groups of troops from the divisions were captured as they attempted to return to North Korea, including up to 3,000 soldiers. The attacking force of over 20,000 had been reduced to only 6,000 by the end of the fighting at Masan.

The position around Masan remained locked in a bitter stalemate during the entire six weeks of the Battle of Pusan Perimeter. Each side attempted several offensives on the other in an attempt to force a withdrawal, but the KPA were unable to pierce the UN perimeter, and the UN troops were unable to overwhelm the KPA to the point they were forced to withdraw. The battle itself was tactically inconclusive, as neither side was able to decisively defeat the other, however the UN units achieved their strategic goal of preventing the KPA from advancing further east and threatening Pusan. Instead, they were able to hold the line against repeated attacks until the Inchon attack, and were thus successful in defeating the KPA in subsequent engagements.

Desertion had continued to be a problem for the 24th Infantry, a de facto segregated unit. Statistics compiled found the 25th Infantry Division had to detain 116 deserters from the 24th Infantry throughout August, compared to 15 from the 27th Infantry and 12 from the 35th Infantry. The regiment had already been criticized for its poor performance at the Battle of Sangju several weeks earlier. In late August, Kean began investigating the unit's behavior, finding its poor performance was starting to bring other units of the division down as well. Kean considered the regiment a weak link in the chain, and after its poor performance at the battles of Battle Mountain and Haman, he suggested to Walker that the regiment be disbanded and its troops be used as replacements for other units in the field. Virtually all of the officers and enlisted men in the regiment were supportive of this idea, but Walker declined, feeling he could not afford to lose a regiment. Conversely, the 35th Infantry was widely praised for its actions at the Kum River line. The regiment had performed so well in repulsing the North Koreans that Kean nominated it for a Presidential Unit Citation.
