= Underwater bridge =

Military structure

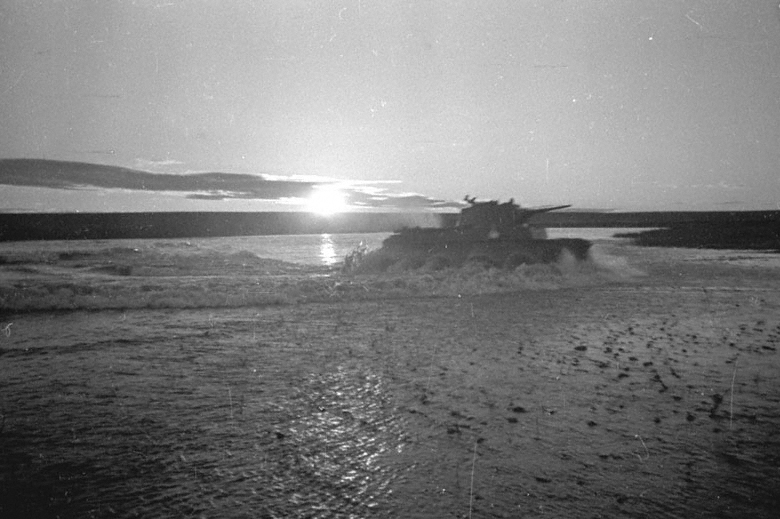
A Soviet tank crosses the Khalkhyn Gol river, August 1939.

An underwater bridge is a military structure that was employed during World War II and the Korean War.

Underwater bridges, typically constructed of logs, sand and dirt just beneath the surface of the water in a river or similar narrow body of water, allow heavier vehicles to cross the river driving through only shallow water. Air reconnaissance finds such "bridges" difficult to spot; even if seen, air strikes have difficulty in destroying them as the water insulates the structure from blasts.

Soviet troops, notably Georgy Zhukov, used the concept during the Khalkhin Gol campaign (1939) and in World War II (1941-1945). North Korean troops also used such structures during the Korean War (1950-1953), particularly to cross the Naktong River during the Battle of Pusan Perimeter of August-September 1950. In the Vietnam War the Ho Chi Minh trail used such bridges.

== See also ==
- Low water crossing
- Ford

== Bibliography ==
- Fehrenbach, T.R. (2001). This Kind of War: The Classic Korean War History – Fiftieth Anniversary Edition. Potomac Books Inc. ISBN 978-1-57488-334-3.
- Currey, Cecil (1997). Victory at any Cost: The Genius of Viet Nam's Gen Vo Nguyen Giap. AUSA book - Association of the United States Army. ISBN 1-57488-056-X.
