= Hippocrene Books =

US publishing press

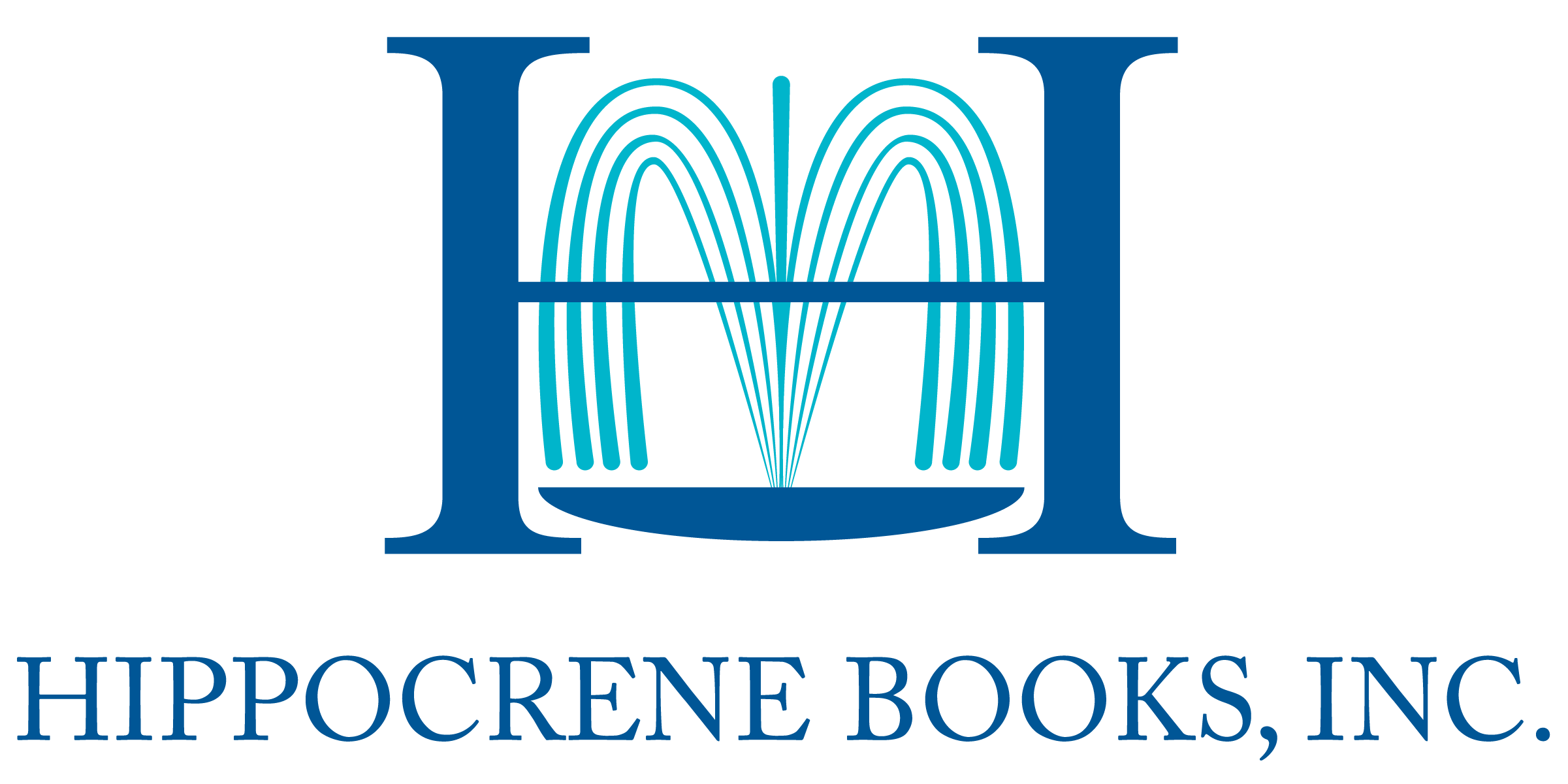
- Founded: 1970
- Founder: George Blagowidow
- Country of origin: United States
- Headquarters location: New York City
- Distribution: Two Rivers Distribution (US); Gazelle Book Services (UK)
- Publication types: Books
- Nonfiction topics: foreign language study guides, international cookbooks, Polish-interest publishing
- Official website: hippocrenebooks.com

Hippocrene Books is an independent US publishing press located at 171 Madison Avenue, New York City, NY 10016. Hippocrene specializes in foreign language study guides, international cookbooks, and Polish-interest publishing.

The foreign language catalog includes the Concise, Practical, and Standard Dictionary series, the travel-oriented Dictionary & Phrasebook series, and the Hippocrene Beginner's textbook series. In the past, Hippocrene has published books on folklore, translations of classic literature, children's dictionaries, and travel guides.

The publishing side grew out of Optimum Book Marketing, established in 1970 by Polish immigrant George Blagowidow. The press takes its name from the mythical Hippocrene fountain associated with the Muses, as seen in the company logo.

Hippocrene Books, Inc., is distributed to the trade by Two River Distribution, an Ingram brand.

== History ==
Hippocrene was started by George Blagowidow, who was born in Poland to Russian parents and survived the Nazi occupation to escape communist Europe in 1945. After attending university in Antwerp, Belgium, he came to New York City in 1951, where he earned master’s and doctorate degrees in business from New York University. He worked at Doubleday, Macmillan, and Reader's Digest before starting his own publishing company with Hippocrene’s first list in spring 1972, featuring European literary classics in translation, including The Doll by Polish novelist Bolesław Prus.

In 1973 the company began distributing foreign-language dictionaries for a German company and continued to thrive in that niche. As of 2008, Hippocrene has published in over 112 languages, including Polish-interest books such as Quo Vadis by Nobel Prize-winning novelist Henryk Sienkiewicz.

Polish-interest publishing led to the launch of the cookbook business, with the publishing of Best of Polish Cooking, by Karen West, in 1983. This highly successful book was followed by the publication of The Polish Country Kitchen: Expanded Edition and Polish Holiday Cookery. Hippocrene then expanded with additional ethnic cookbooks from other regions, publishing to date more than 80 titles.
