= T. R. Fehrenbach =

American historian (1925–2013)

T. R. Fehrenbach, Jr.
- Born: January 12, 1925; San Benito, Texas, U.S.
- Died: December 1, 2013 (aged 88); San Antonio, Texas, U.S.
- Occupations: Historian; Columnist for San Antonio Express-News and other publications
- Spouse: Lillian Fehrenbach

Theodore Reed "T. R." Fehrenbach Jr. (January 12, 1925 – December 1, 2013) was an American historian, columnist, and the former head of the Texas Historical Commission (1987–1991). He graduated from Princeton University in 1947 with a degree in modern languages ("he never pursued graduate study or held a faculty post") and wrote more than twenty books, including the bestseller Lone Star: A History of Texas and Texans and This Kind of War, about the Korean War. Senator John McCain called this book "perhaps the best book ever written on the Korean War". Secretary of Defense James Mattis said "There’s a reason I recommended T. R. Fehrenbach’s book ... that we all pull it out and read it one more time."

Although he served as a U.S. Army officer during the Korean War, his own service is not mentioned in the book. Fehrenbach also wrote for Esquire, The Atlantic, The Saturday Evening Post, and The New Republic. He wrote popular histories of Texas, Mexico, and the Comanche people. For almost 30 years, he wrote a weekly column on Sundays for the San Antonio Express-News. On August 23, 2013, T. R. Fehrenbach announced that he would retire from writing columns because of declining health. T. R. Fehrenbach died of a congenital heart defect at Northeast Baptist Hospital in San Antonio on December 1, 2013.

== Selected bibliography ==
- U.S. Marines In Action, 1962, LCCN 62-2205. Republished in 2000, ISBN 1-58586-062-X
- This Kind of War: A Study In Unpreparedness 1963, LCCN 63-9972. Republished in 1998 as This Kind Of War: The Classic Korean War History ISBN 1-57488-161-2, LCCN 98-27350
- Crossroads in Korea, the Historic Siege of Chipyong-Ni, 1966, LCCN 66-10022
- The Gnomes of Zurich, 1966, LCCN 66-77383
- The Swiss Banks, 1966, LCCN 65-28589
- This Kind Of Peace, 1966, LCCN 66-17238
- FDR's Undeclared War, 1939–1941, 1967, LCCN 67-13415
- Greatness to Spare: The Heroic Sacrifices of the Men Who Signed the Declaration of Independence, 1968, LCCN 68-30756. Republished in 2000, ISBN 0-7351-0164-7
- The Fight for Korea: from the War of 1950 to the Pueblo Incident, 1969, LCCN 68-29982
- The United Nations in war and peace, 1968, LCCN 68-23669
- Lone Star: A History of Texas and the Texans, 1968, LCCN 68-25222. Republished in 2000, ISBN 0-306-80942-7, LCCN 00-21771
- Fire And Blood: A History Of Mexico, 1973, LCCN 72-91265. Republished in 1995, ISBN 0-306-80628-2, LCCN 94-45811
- Comanches: The Destruction of a People, 1974, LCCN 73-20761. Republished in 2003 as Comanches: The History of a People, ISBN 1-4000-3049-8, LCCN 2003-267713
- Seven Keys To Texas, 1983, ISBN 0-87404-069-8, LCCN 82-74272
- Texas: A Salute from Above, 1985, ISBN 0-940672-28-6, LCCN 84-52739

Sources for book publication data: United States Library of Congress, Amazon.com.

== T. R. Fehrenbach Award ==
The Texas Historical Commission gives this award to recognize books about Texas history and pre-history. The award is given annually.

== Sources ==
- Fehrenbach, T. R., Comanches: The Destruction of a People, Knopf, New York, New York via The Wall Street Journal..1974
