= 12th Division (North Korea) =

Antong Choe Chun Guk 12th Infantry Division
- Active: July 1949 -
- Country: Democratic People's Republic of Korea
- Allegiance: Korean People's Army
- Branch: Ground Force
- Type: Infantry
- Garrison/HQ: Anbyon County
- Engagements: Korean War

The 12th Infantry Division was a division of the Korean People's Army during the 20th century.

It was activated in Wonsan and was initially composed of Korean-personnel regiments of the PLA 156th Division and was initially composed of the 30th, 31st and 32nd Infantry Regiments. The unit was initially equipped with vehicles transferred to North Korea from the Soviet Union shortly after April 1950.

In April 1950, the People's Republic of China returned 12,000 more veterans of the PVA, that had helped the Chinese communists during the Second Sino-Japanese War and the Chinese Civil War, to Korea, where they formed the 7th Division (redesignated the 12th about July 2, 1950).

Artillery units of the 12th Division, at the time of the division's activation at Wonsan in April or May 1950, were composed of battle-seasoned Korean veterans from the Chinese People's Liberation Army.

== Korean War ==
The 12th Division part of the North Korean advanced from Seoul to Taejon during the Korean War. It also fought in the Battle of Pusan Perimeter. During this fight it suffered such heavy losses it merged with the NK 766th Infantry Regiment to regain its strength.

On September 16, in the I Corps sector, elements of the Capital Division fought their way through the streets of An'gang-ni. The next day, advancing from the west in the II Corps sector, a battalion of the ROK 7th Division linked up with elements of the Capital Division, closing a two-week-old gap between the ROK I and II Corps. The NKPA's 12th Division waged a series of stubborn delaying actions against the Capital Division in the vicinity of Kigye as the North Koreans retreated northward into the mountains. Kigye fell back under South Korean control on September 22, 1950.

In 2009 the location of the 7th Division was reported as Anbyeong-gun (Anbyon County), Kangwon Province.
