= William Thompson (Medal of Honor, 1950) =

United States Army Medal of Honor recipient

William Henry Thompson
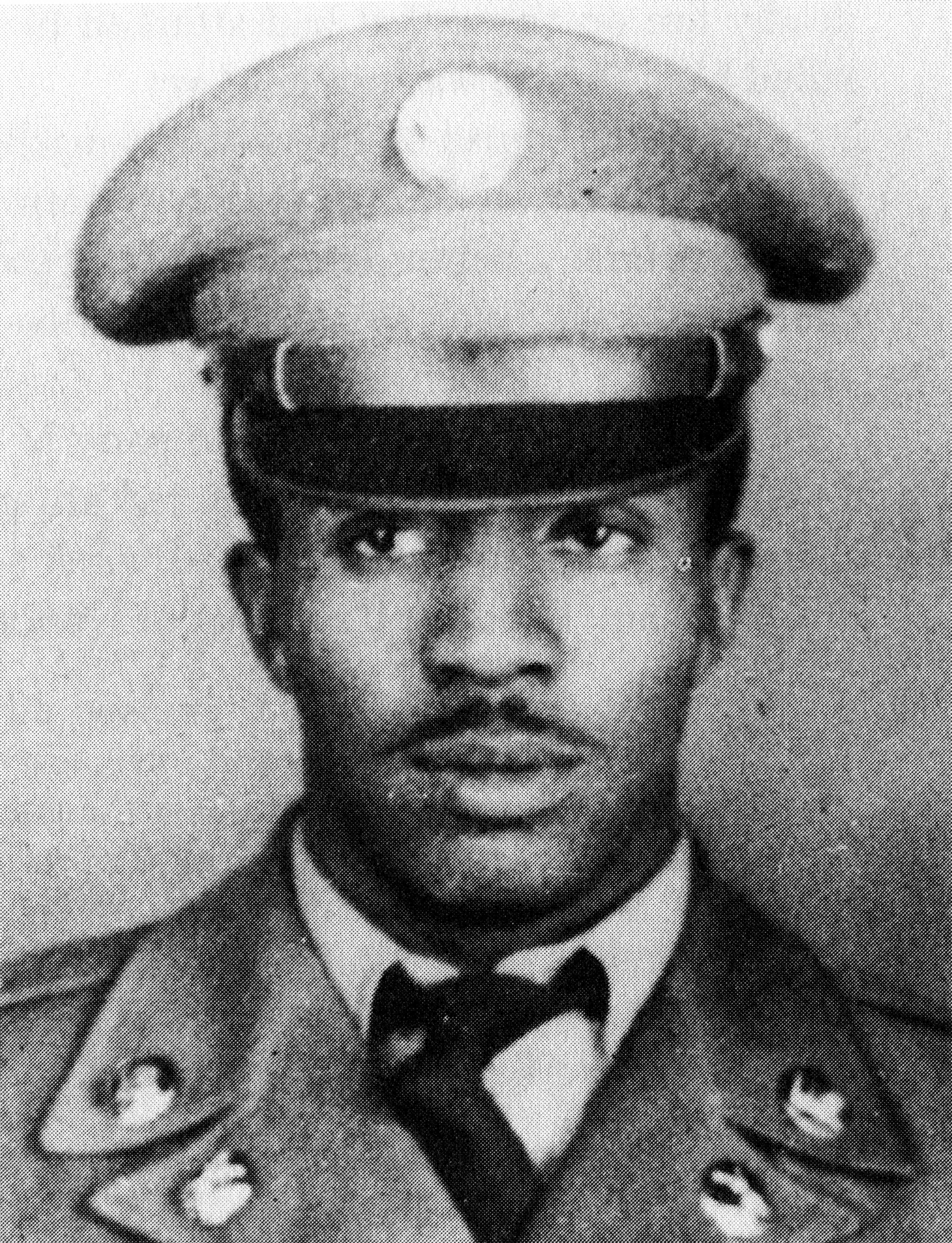
- William Thompson
- Born: August 16, 1927; New York City, New York, U.S.
- Died: August 6, 1950 (aged 22); Masan, South Korea
- Burial place: Long Island National Cemetery, Farmingdale, New York, U.S.
- Military career
- Allegiance: United States
- Branch: United States Army
- Service years: 1945–1947, 1948–1950
- Rank: Private first class
- Service number: 42259324
- Units: 24th Infantry Regiment, 25th Infantry Division
- Conflicts: World War II; Korean War: Battle of Sangju; Battle of Pusan Perimeter; Battle of Masan; Battle of Haman †
- Awards: Medal of Honor; Purple Heart

William Henry Thompson (August 16, 1927 – August 6, 1950) was a United States Army soldier and a posthumous recipient of the United States military's highest decoration, the Medal of Honor, for his actions in the Korean War.

Born to a single mother in an impoverished neighborhood in New York City, Thompson entered the Army in 1945 and served tours in Alaska and Japan. At the outbreak of the Korean War, Thompson was a machine gunner of the U.S. 24th Infantry Regiment, a de facto segregated unit.

During the Battle of Masan in August 1950, Thompson was part of a unit conducting an offensive along the Pusan Perimeter. When North Korean troops attacked his company and caused many men to panic and scatter, Thompson stood his ground, refusing orders to evacuate despite being wounded, and covered the retreat of his platoon until he was killed by a grenade. For his actions, Thompson was awarded the Medal of Honor, one of only two African Americans to be so honored in the war.

== Biography ==
William Thompson was born on August 16, 1927, in Brooklyn, New York to an unmarried mother. Little is known of Thompson's early life, but he grew up in an impoverished tenement house neighborhood. He dropped out of school at a young age, and spent his teen years wandering the streets. A local minister noticed Thompson sleeping in a park one evening and took him to a homeless shelter, the New York Home for Homeless Boys. Thompson remained a resident there until he turned 18 in 1945.

Some sources alternatively state Thompson decided to join the United States Army as an opportunity to escape poverty, or that he was drafted.

=== Military career ===
Thompson enlisted in the army in October 1945 and, after basic combat training, was assigned to a post in Adak, Alaska. After 18 months, he was honorably discharged from the military, but found adjustment to civilian life difficult and opted to return to the military. In January 1948, Thompson reenlisted and was assigned to the 6th Infantry Division, which was on occupation duty in South Korea. When the 6th Infantry Division returned to the United States, he was reassigned to the 24th Infantry Regiment, 25th Infantry Division which was assigned to the post-World War II occupation of Japan. His Military Occupational Specialty was 4812, that of a heavy weapons infantryman who operated automatic weapons.

The 24th Infantry was a de facto segregated unit, but Thompson nonetheless enjoyed his time in the military viewing it as one of few places where an African American could enjoy some degree of comfort. Described as "thin, hollow-eyed and quiet," he was an effective soldier, consistently maintaining his uniform and equipment and keeping his firearms extremely clean. Thompson was also a skilled marksman and rarely had behavioral problems. He was content in the lower ranks of the military, preferring to follow orders instead of giving them.

At the outbreak of the Korean War, Thompson was a private first class, part of M Company of 3rd Battalion, 24th Infantry, the heavy weapons support company for the battalion.

The 24th Infantry first came into heavy contact with North Korean army troops on July 22 during the Battle of Sangju. When North Korean rifle fire came in on the dispersed regiment, its troops almost immediately began retreating from the front, ignoring officers' commands to stay in position. Historians blame the retreat as much on officers' ineptitude as on the panicking of individual soldiers. The tendency to panic continued in nearly all the 24th Infantry operations west of Sangju. Men left their positions and straggled to the rear, abandoning weapons. On many occasions, units lost most of their equipment while on the move, even when not under fire, causing logistical shortages. In other cases, the majority of a unit deserted its position at the first sign of North Korean fire. The situation became so dire that the regiment's senior officers set up a checkpoint west of the town and stopped every vehicle coming from the west, removing stragglers attempting to retreat. Many jeeps were filled with six or seven men claiming they were retreating after their position was overrun. The 24th quickly gained a poor reputation as a "bug out" unit, and was blasted for its poor performance during combat. Historians contend its accomplishments, particularly at the Battle of Yechon, were ignored, while shortcomings were seized upon to depict the 24th as a sub-par unit, and African-Americans as inferior soldiers to whites.

=== Medal of Honor action ===
On August 6, 1950, as the Battle of Pusan Perimeter was beginning, the 25th Infantry Division was engaged in a counteroffensive during the Battle of Masan. That night, M Company was supporting the division's advance near the city of Haman, South Korea, in a mountain valley south of Sobuk-san in what would become the Battle of Battle Mountain. As Thompson's platoon approached the town, it was ambushed by a large force of North Korean troops. Automatic weapons fire caused several men in the company to panic and flee. Those remaining were ordered into a tight perimeter by Second Lieutenant Herbert H. Wilson.

After a North Korean grenade knocked out the only other remaining heavy weapons specialist, Thompson manned the last heavy weapon in the platoon: his .30 caliber M1917 Browning machine gun. Thompson soon became the focus of the North Korean fire. During this period, Thompson was wounded several times by small arms fire and grenade fragments but ignored his injuries and did not inform the rest of his unit. After the platoon was ordered to withdraw, Wilson ordered it to higher ground.

Crawling to Thompson's position, Wilson discovered his injuries. Wilson ordered Thompson to withdraw twice, but the latter refused to obey and continued to fire on the advancing North Koreans. Thompson told Wilson he was dying and was not going to move back. Wilson then called forward two non-commissioned officers who unsuccessfully attempted to physically remove Thompson from the gun. Thompson told them, "Get out of here, I'll cover you!" Wilson reluctantly ordered the remaining men to pull back. As the platoon retreated, they heard Thompson's continued fire until several grenades followed by a larger explosion erupted near his position, at which point his gun fell silent.

A few days later, when M Company retook the area, they discovered Thompson had made a last stand and killed a large number of North Koreans before dying. His covering fire had prevented higher casualties in his unit as it withdrew.

=== Subsequent recognition ===
Thompson's actions were initially overlooked by division commanders, who instead focused on the poor performance of the 24th Infantry Regiment, whose soldiers panicked and fled from combat. Thompson's battalion commander, Lieutenant Colonel Melvin Blair, initially refused to submit a recommendation, until January 4, 1951, five months after the action. Thompson initially received a Silver Star Medal for the action but Blair changed his mind and began pushing the paperwork through for the Medal of Honor, personally locating the witnesses who could attest to Thompson's valor. Blair hoped Thompson's recognition would improve other commanders' views on the 24th Infantry Regiment. Eventually, though, the 24th was disbanded and its personnel integrated into other units.

On June 21, 1951, General of the Army Omar Bradley presented Thompson's mother with the Medal of Honor, posthumously recognizing Thompson's actions.

== Medal of Honor citation ==
Thompson was the first of two African Americans to be awarded the Medal of Honor in Korea, the other being Cornelius H. Charlton in June 1951. Charlton was also a member of the 24th Infantry who was recognized posthumously. Other African Americans who fought in Korea are known to have been nominated for the medal but did not receive it. Thompson and Charlton were the first two African Americans to be awarded the Medal of Honor since the Spanish–American War, though several World War II veterans were later nominated. The two nominations had seen delays because unit commanders refused to submit their nominations. In all, 131 men were awarded the medal during and in the immediate aftermath of the war.

Pfc. Thompson distinguished himself by conspicuous gallantry and intrepidity above and beyond the call of duty in action against the enemy. While his platoon was reorganizing under cover of darkness, fanatical enemy forces in overwhelming strength launched a surprise attack on the unit. Pfc. Thompson set up his machine gun in the path of the onslaught and swept the enemy with withering fire, pinning them down momentarily thus permitting the remainder of his platoon to withdraw to a more tenable position. Although hit repeatedly by grenade fragments and small-arms fire, he resisted all efforts of his comrades to induce him to withdraw, steadfastly remained at his machine gun and continued to deliver deadly, accurate fire until mortally wounded by an enemy grenade. Pfc. Thompson's dauntless courage and gallant self-sacrifice reflect the highest credit on himself and uphold the esteemed traditions of military service.

== Awards and Decorations ==
Thompson's awards and decorations include:

Badge	Combat Infantryman Badge		
1st row	Medal of Honor		
2nd row	Purple Heart	Army Good Conduct Medal	American Campaign Medal
3rd row	World War II Victory Medal	Army of Occupation Medal	National Defense Service Medal
4th row	Korean Service Medal with 1 Campaign star	United Nations Service Medal Korea	Korean War Service Medal Retroactively Awarded, 2003
Unit awards	Korean Presidential Unit Citation		

=== Patches ===
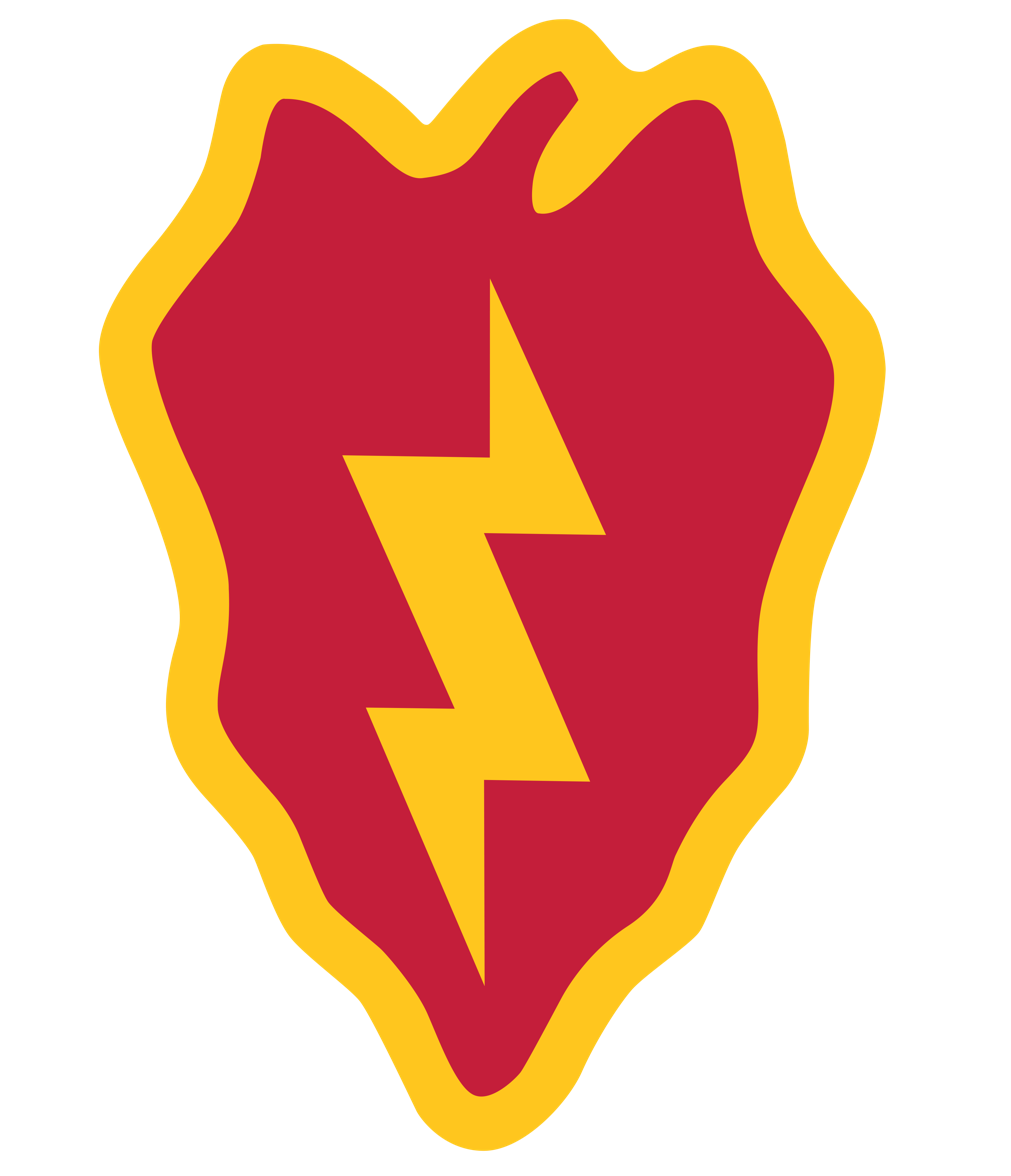

6th Infantry Division Insignia	25th Infantry Division Insignia

== See also ==
- List of Korean War Medal of Honor recipients
- List of African American Medal of Honor recipients
