= Melvin O. Handrich =

United States Army Medal of Honor recipient

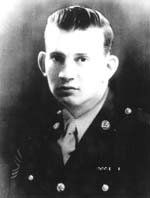
- Medal of Honor recipient Melvin Handrich
- Born: January 26, 1919; Manawa, Wisconsin, United States
- Died: August 26, 1950 (aged 31) near Sŏbuk-san, Pusan Perimeter, South Korea
- Burial place: Little Wolf Cemetery in Manawa, Wisconsin
- Military career
- Allegiance: United States
- Branch: United States Army
- Service years: 1942–1945; 1949–1950
- Rank: Master Sergeant
- Service number: 36258213
- Conflicts: World War II: Pacific War; Aleutian Islands campaign; Battle of Kiska; Korean War: Battle of Pusan Perimeter; Battle of Battle Mountain †
- Awards: Medal of Honor; Bronze Star Medal; Purple Heart (4)

Melvin Oscar Handrich (January 26, 1919 – August 26, 1950) was a soldier in the United States Army during both World War II and the Korean War. He was posthumously awarded the Medal of Honor for his actions on August 25 and 26, 1950, during the Battle of Battle Mountain, part of the Battle of Pusan Perimeter. He is buried at Little Wolf Cemetery in Manawa, Waupaca County, Wisconsin.

== Military career ==
Handrich first entered the United States Army in August 1942. He was a member of the 1st Company, 2d Regiment (1-2), First Special Service Force (FSSF) ("The Devil's Brigade") and later Company I, 508th Parachute Infantry Regiment, 82d Airborne Division. He participated in the recapture of Kiska (August 15, 1943), part of the Aleutian Islands Campaign, and saw action in Italy, France, Belgium, and Germany.

Wounded three times, Handrich received the Purple Heart with two oak leaf clusters. Other World War II awards included the Combat Infantryman Badge, the Bronze Star Medal, the Asiatic-Pacific Campaign Medal with one bronze Campaign star, and the European-African-Middle Eastern Campaign Medal with Arrowhead device and one silver and one bronze Campaign star. He was discharged from the Army in September 1945.

Handrich re-enlisted in January 1949 and was sent to the Far East command in March 1949. The Medal of Honor was presented to Handrich's father by General of the Army Omar N. Bradley at a Pentagon ceremony on June 21, 1951.

On August 4, 1969, the 83d Ordnance Battalion compound at Anyang-ni was named Camp Handrich in his honor.

== Medal of Honor citation ==
Department of the Army, General Orders No. 60, August 2, 1951
Action Date: August 25 & 26, 1950
Service: Army
Rank: Master Sergeant
Company: Company C
Regiment: 5th Infantry

Citation:

Master Sergeant Melvin O. Handrich (Service No. 36258213), Infantry, United States Army, a member of Company C, 5th Infantry, distinguished himself by conspicuous gallantry and intrepidity above and beyond the call of duty in action on 25 and 26 August 1950, near Sobuk San Mountain, Korea. His company was engaged in repulsing an estimated 150 enemy who were threatening to overrun its position. Near midnight on 25 August, a hostile group of over 100 strong attempted to infiltrate the company perimeter. Sergeant Handrich, despite the heavy enemy fire, voluntarily left the comparative safety of the defensive area and moved to a forward position where he could direct mortar and artillery fire upon the advancing enemy. He remained at this post for 8 hours directing fire against the enemy who often approached within 50 feet of his position. Again, on the morning of 26 August, another strong hostile force attempted to overrun the company's position. With complete disregard for his safety, Sergeant Handrich rose to his feet and from this exposed position fired his rifle and directed mortar and artillery fire on the attackers. At the peak of this action, he observed elements of his company preparing to withdraw. He perilously made his way across fire-swept terrain to the defense area where, by example and forceful leadership, he reorganized the men to continue the fight. During the action, Sergeant Handrich was severely wounded. Refusing to take cover or be evacuated, he returned to his forward position and continued to direct the company's fire. Later, a determined enemy attack overran Sergeant Handrich's position and he was mortally wounded. When the position was retaken, over 70 enemy dead were counted in the area he had so intrepidly defended. Sergeant Handrich's sustained personal bravery, consummate courage, and gallant self-sacrifice reflect untold glory upon himself and the heroic traditions of military service.

The 25th Infantry Division Association states that the 5th Infantry Regimental Combat Team was attached to the 25th Infantry Division at the time of this action.

== Awards and decorations ==
Msg Handrich received the following awards for his service.

| Badge | Combat Infantryman Badge with Star denoting 2nd award | | |
| 1st row | Medal of Honor | Bronze Star Medal | Purple Heart with 3 Oak leaf clusters |
| 2nd row | Army Good Conduct Medal | American Campaign Medal | Asiatic-Pacific Campaign Medal with 1 Campaign star |
| 3rd row | European-African-Middle Eastern Campaign Medal with Arrowhead Device and 6 Campaign stars | World War II Victory Medal | National Defense Service Medal |
| 4th row | Korean Service Medal with 1 Campaign star | United Nations Service Medal Korea | Korean War Service Medal Retroactively Awarded, 2003 |
| Badge | Parachutist Badge | | |
| Unit awards | Presidential Unit Citation with 2 Oak leaf clusters | | Korean Presidential Unit Citation |

== See also ==
- List of Korean War Medal of Honor recipients
- List of 25th Infantry Division Medal of Honor recipients
- Operation Cottage
