= Seobuksan =

Mountain in South Korea

Highest point
- Elevation: 738.5 m (2,423 ft)
- Coordinates: 35.1687°N 128.4196°E

Geography
- Location: South Korea

Korean name
- Hangul: 서북산
- Hanja: 西北山
- RR: Seobuksan
- MR: Sŏbuksan

Seobuksan (Korean: 서북산) is a mountain in South Korea. It is about eight miles west of Masan in South Gyeongsang Province. Seobuksan has an elevation of 738.5 m (2,423 ft).

== See also ==
- List of mountains in Korea
