= Chaplain–Medic massacre =

1950 war crime during the Korean War

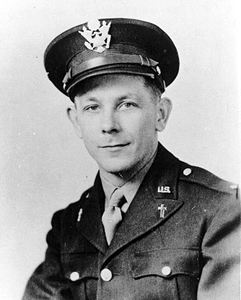
- Herman G. Felhoelter, a U.S. Army chaplain who was killed in the massacre
- Location: 36.4285°N 127.2950°E; Tuman (current Duman-ri, Geumnam-myeon, Sejong City, South Korea)
- Date: July 16, 1950; 21:30 (KST)
- Target: U.S. Army prisoners of war
- Attack type: Mass murder
- Deaths: 30 U.S. soldiers and one Roman Catholic chaplain murdered
- Injuries: 1 (U.S. soldier)
- Perpetrator: Korean People's Army soldiers
- Motive: Retribution

The Chaplain–Medic massacre took place in the Korean War on July 16, 1950, on a mountain above the village of Tuman (current Duman-ri, Geumnam-myeon, Sejong City). South Korean local natives claim that it took place on a mountain above the village of Yongdam-ri, which is next to Duman-ri. Thirty unarmed, critically wounded United States Army (US) soldiers and an unarmed chaplain were murdered by members of the Korean People's Army (KPA) during the Battle of the Kum River.

Operating at the Kum River, troops of the US 19th Infantry Regiment, 24th Infantry Division, were cut off from resupply by a roadblock established by KPA troops of the 3rd Division. The roadblock proved difficult to break, and forced US troops to move through nearby mountains to evacuate their wounded.

Thirty critically wounded US troops were stranded at the top of a mountain. Attended to by only two non-combatants, a chaplain and a medic, the wounded were discovered by a KPA patrol. Though the medic was able to escape, the KPA executed the unarmed chaplain as he prayed over the wounded, then killed the rest of them. The massacre was one of several incidents that led US commanders to establish a commission in July to look into war crimes during the war. The same month, the KPA commanders, concerned about the way their soldiers were treating prisoners of war, laid out stricter guidelines for handling enemy captives. Other than this change, the historiography of the incident in North Korean sources is largely unknown; as a result, sources detailing the incident are almost exclusively from the United States and other United Nations allies.

== Background ==
=== Outbreak of war ===
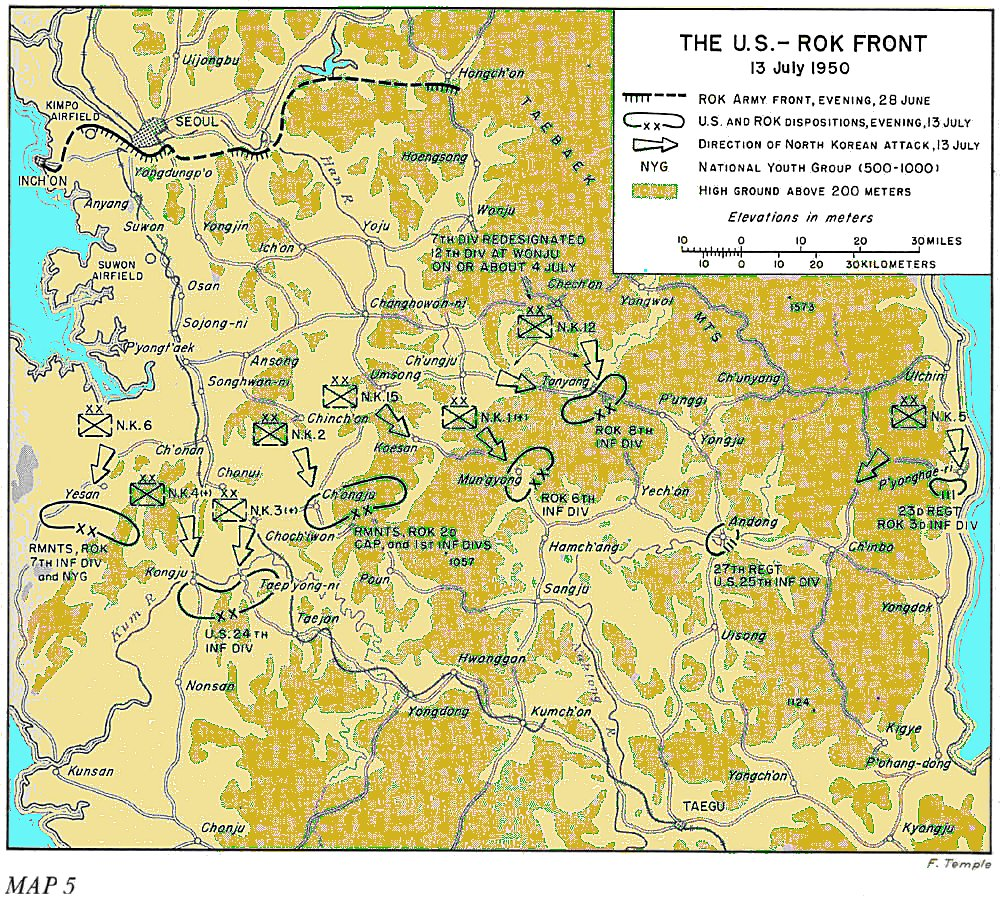
Front line of Korean War, July 13, 1950

Following the invasion of South Korea by North Korea, the United Nations committed troops to the conflict to prevent the collapse of South Korea. However, the number of US forces in the Far East available to support this effort had been steadily decreasing since the end of World War II, five years earlier. The closest US division, the 24th Infantry Division of the Eighth United States Army, headquartered in Japan, was understrength, and most of its equipment was antiquated due to defense cutbacks enacted in the first Truman administration. Nevertheless, the 24th Infantry Division was the first US unit sent into Korea to absorb the initial "shock" of KPA advances and to buy time for the deployment of additional forces, such as the 7th Infantry Division, 25th Infantry Division, 1st Cavalry Division, 1st Provisional Marine Brigade and other Eighth Army supporting units.

=== Delaying action ===
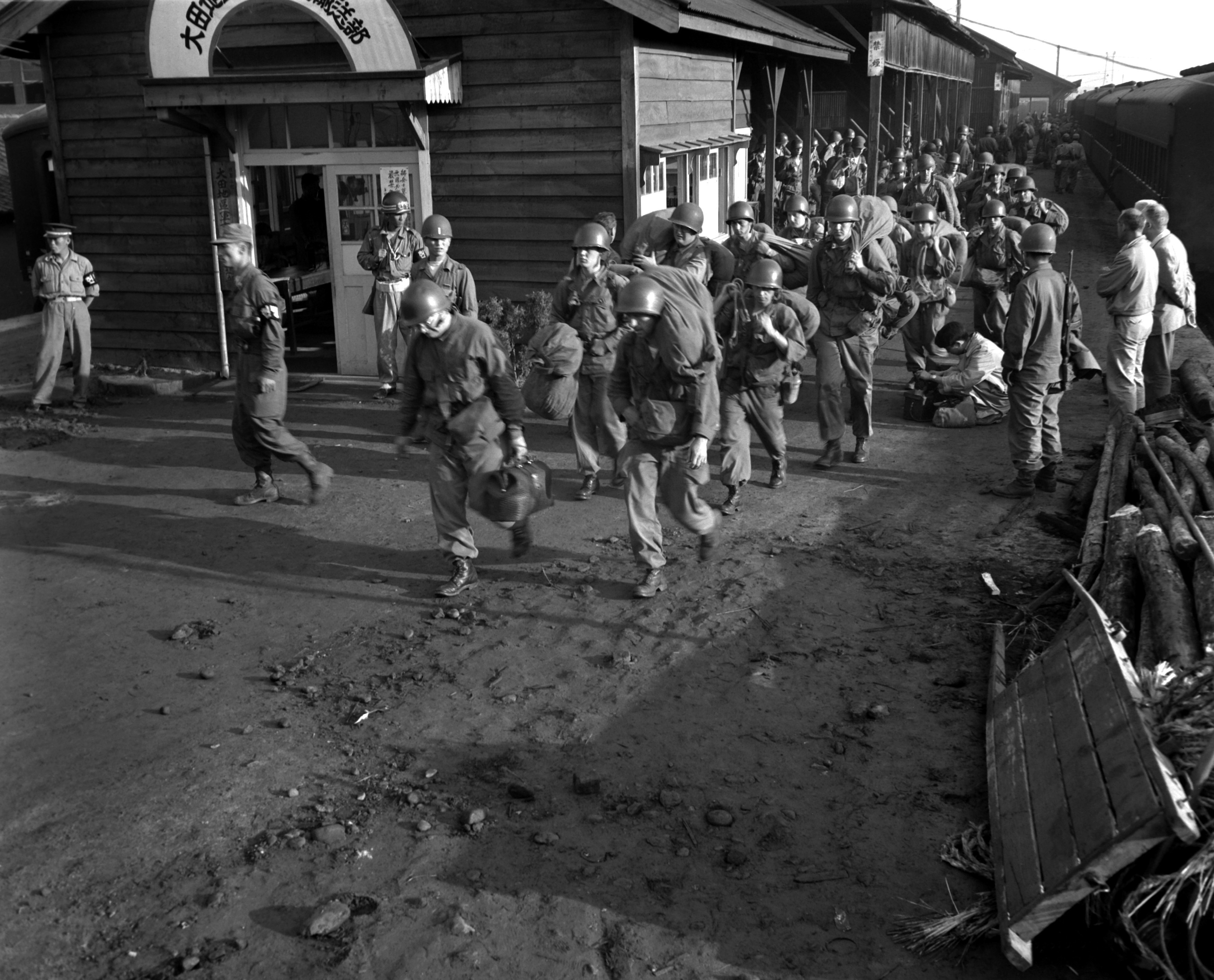
Task Force Smith arrives in South Korea

Advance elements of the 24th Infantry Division were badly defeated in the Battle of Osan on July 5, during the first battle between US and KPA forces. The force at the battle, Task Force Smith, retreated from Osan, and US forces were again defeated in the Battle of Pyongtaek. For over a week after the defeat of Task Force Smith, 24th Infantry Division soldiers were repeatedly defeated and forced south by the KPA's superior numbers and equipment. The 24th Infantry Division was systematically pushed south at and around Chochiwon, Chonan, Pyongtaek, Hadong, and Yechon. These American soldiers, most of whom had experienced only occupation duty in Japan and no actual combat, were unprepared compared to the more disciplined North Korean units.

On July 12, the division's commander, Major General William F. Dean, ordered the division's 19th, 21st and 34th infantry regiments to cross the Geum River, destroying all bridges behind them, and to establish defensive positions around Daejon. Daejon was a major South Korean city 100 miles (160 km) south of Seoul and 130 miles (210 km) northwest of Busan, and was the site of the 24th Infantry Division's headquarters. Dean formed a line with the 34th Infantry and 19th Infantry facing east, and held the battered 21st Infantry in reserve to the southeast. The Geum River wrapped north and west around the city, providing a defensive line 10–15 miles (16–24 km) from the outskirts of Daejon, which is protected on the south by the Sobaek Mountains. With major railroad lines and roads emanating in all directions, Daejon stood as a major transportation hub between Seoul and Daegu, giving it great strategic value for both the US and KPA forces. Daejon had to be held to stop the North Korean forces from converging on the unfinished defensive lines around Busan.

== Massacre ==
=== North Korean attack ===
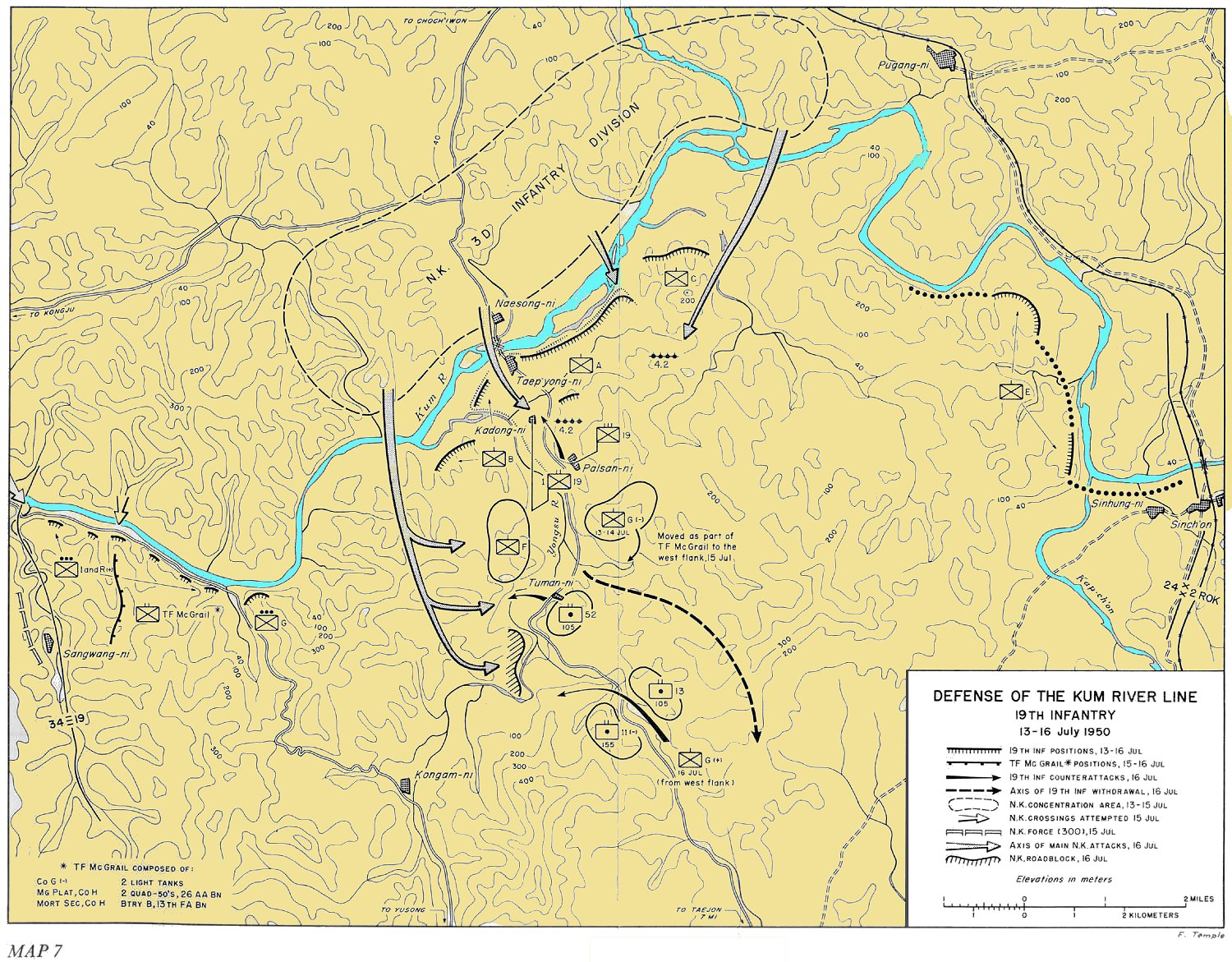
Map of the US 19th Infantry Regiment's defense at the Kum River

Following an initial penetration to the north, the retreating 34th Infantry moved south to Nonsan. On July 15, the 19th Infantry moved its 2nd Battalion to fill some of the gaps left by the 34th. There, it was reinforced by troops from the Republic of Korea Army (ROK). The combined forces observed a large build-up of KPA troops on the west side of the river. At 03:00 on July 16, the KPA launched a massive barrage of tank, artillery and mortar fire on the 19th Infantry positions and KPA troops began to cross the river in boats. The KPA forces gathered on the west bank and assaulted the positions of the 1st Battalion's C and E companies, followed by a second landing against B Company. KPA forces pushed against the entire battalion, threatening to overwhelm it. The regimental commander ordered all support troops and officers to the line and they were able to repulse the assault. However, in the melee, KPA forces infiltrated their rear elements, attacking the reserve forces and blocking supply lines. Stretched thin, the 19th Infantry was unable to hold the line at the Kum River and simultaneously repel the KPA forces.

=== Roadblock ===
KPA troops promptly set up a roadblock directly behind the 19th Infantry's line in its main route of supply along the road near the village of Tuman, just south of Yusong on Taejon's western outskirts. The roadblock quickly became a serious problem for US forces trying to move ammunition and wounded to and from the Kum River line. Around 13:00 on July 16, the 19th Infantry regimental commander contacted Dean, who ordered him to break the roadblock. However, KPA troops had set up at least six machine-gun nests above the road at Tuman, and repeated attacks against it were unable to drive the KPA troops away.

The roadblock was preventing evacuation of the wounded. Troops attempted to drive wounded in jeeps through the roadblock, but this exposed them to machine-gun fire. By 16:00 supply columns were also piling up at the block, unable to proceed as armor and airstrikes attempted to dislodge the KPA. Five hundred men from the regiment were gathered waiting to break the roadblock while heavy armor units from Taejon moved against it from the other side. During this time, US troops from the 19th Infantry, desperate to move around the roadblock to obtain supplies and care for the wounded, began moving through the surrounding hills. One tank was able to make it through the roadblock to evacuate the 19th Infantry's wounded commander, but by 19:00, commanders ordered the regiment to move its wounded along the ridges to the east of the roadblock.

=== Massacre ===
At 21:00, about 100 men of the 19th Infantry moved into the hills to the east of the town. They carried with them about 30 wounded, including several litter-bound patients too seriously wounded to walk. Some of the group of 100 were ordered to carry these men, but many of them separated from the group in the mountains. By the time they reached the top of the mountain, officers decided some of the seriously wounded could not be carried any further, as their carriers were exhausted.

for extraordinary heroism in connection with military operations against an armed enemy of the United Nations while attached to Headquarters and Headquarters Company, 19th Infantry Regiment, 24th Infantry Division. Captain (Chaplain) Felhoelter distinguished himself by extraordinary heroism in action against enemy aggressor forces on the Kum River, north of Taejon, Korea, on 16 July 1950. When seriously wounded men of the 19th Infantry could not be evacuated in the face of an overwhelming night attack by superior enemy forces who had cut off the main route of withdrawal, Chaplain Felhoelter, without regard for his own personal safety, voluntarily remained behind to give his wounded comrades spiritual comfort and aid. When last seen, Chaplain Felhoelter was still administering to the wounded. —Citation

The regimental medical officer, Captain Linton J. Buttrey, and Chaplain Herman G. Felhoelter remained behind with the wounded, intending to move them when another group of troops came through who could carry them. Buttrey wore a Red Cross brassard identifying him as a medic, while Felhoelter wore a large white Latin cross brassard, identifying him as a military chaplain in the U.S. Army Chaplain Corps. The two who remained and the wounded were non-combatants under international law, as they carried no weapons.

=== Death of Father Felhoelter ===
Buttrey and Felhoelter were both unarmed, and wore the insignias of their respective vocations, indicating their non-combatant status. Soon, Buttrey and Felhoelter heard a KPA patrol approaching, a group of men from the KPA 3rd Division which had infiltrated the US lines. Felhoelter told Buttrey to escape, and although Buttrey was shot and severely wounded in the ankle by KPA fire while running, he was able to get away. Felhoelter then began administering last rites and extreme unction to the wounded as they lay on their litters. From this point, observers from the 19th Infantry's regimental Headquarters and Headquarters Company watched through binoculars from a distance as a patrol of young-looking and possibly untrained KPA troops approached the site of the wounded. The troops were armed with Soviet-made rifles and PPSh-41 "burp guns". As Felhoelter knelt to pray over the wounded US soldiers, the KPA troops shot him in the head and back. They then shot and killed all of the thirty critically wounded soldiers with their automatic weapons before withdrawing into the wilderness.

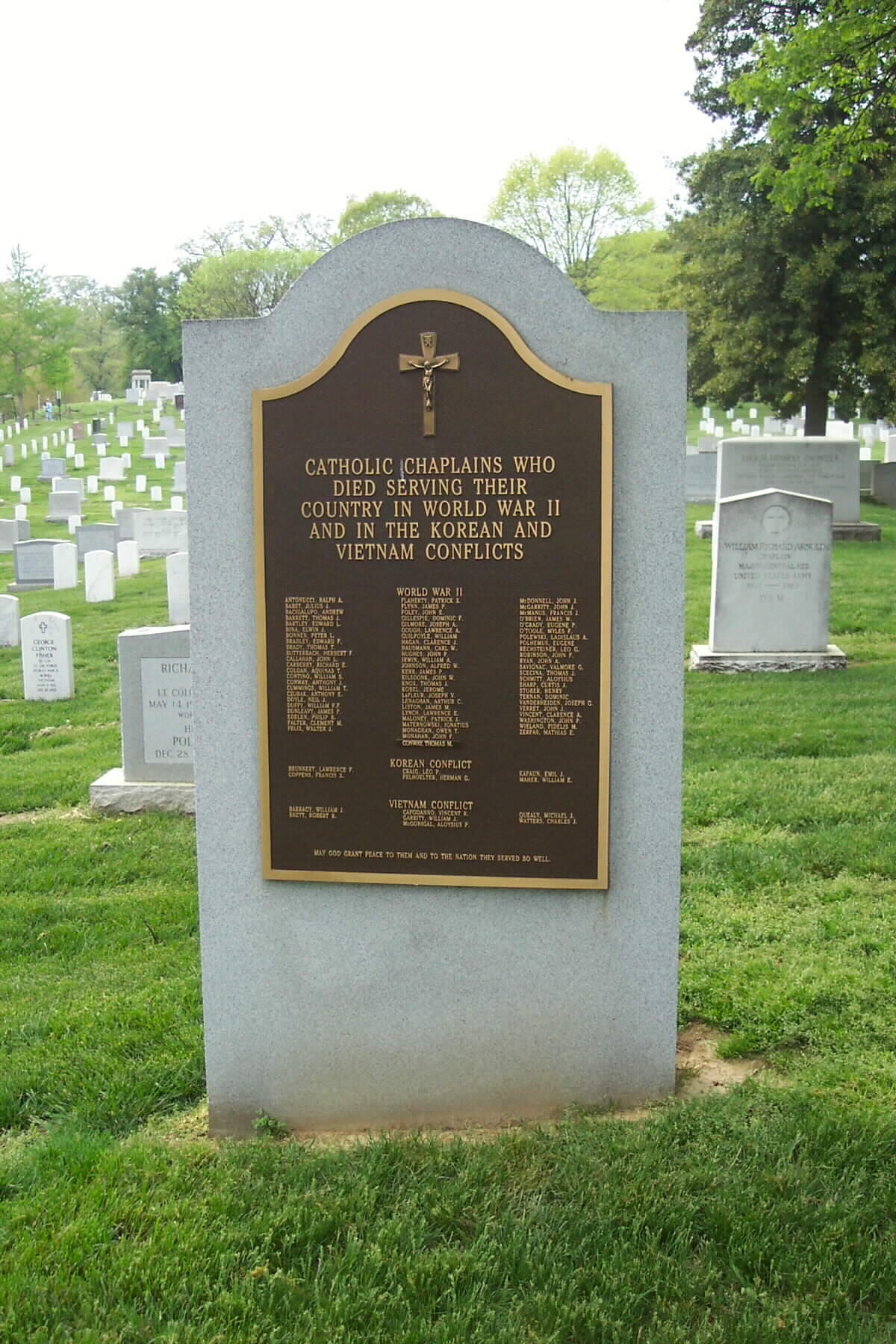
The Chaplain's Hill monument in Arlington National Cemetery, where Felhoelter is memorialized

The attack was witnessed from hills some distance away through binoculars by other members of the 19th Infantry. Felhoelter was awarded the Distinguished Service Cross posthumously. Felhoelter became the first of several military chaplains to be killed in the Korean conflict.

Felhoelter's background

Father Herman Gilbert Felhoelter OFM was born in Louisville, Kentucky, in 1913. He joined the Franciscans and was ordained for the Friars Minor in 1939. He served as an Army chaplain in World War II and received a Bronze Star for service under fire. After that war, Felhoelter became an assistant pastor in Cincinnati, but was recommissioned in 1948 and appointed chaplain to the US 19th Infantry and posted to Korea. Four days before his death, he had written his mother: "Don't worry, Mother. God's will be done. I feel so good to know the power of your prayers accompanying me ... I am happy in the thought that I can help some souls who need help."

Felhoelter's U.S. military decorations
Distinguished Service Cross
Bronze Star
Korean Service Medal
United Nations Korea Medal

== Aftermath ==
US troops were able to recover the bodies of only three of the victims of the massacre, including Father Felhoelter, due to the chaos of the battle and subsequent US withdrawal, and were unable to capture any KPA troops who participated in the massacre. For his actions in volunteering to stay behind with the wounded, Father Felhoelter was posthumously awarded the Distinguished Service Cross, the second highest decoration for valor awarded by the US military. His remains were returned to the United States and are buried in St. Michael's Cemetery, Louisville. He was the first chaplain of the war to receive an award for valor. He received a brief obituary in Time magazine in December 1952. Felhoelter was the first of twelve chaplains killed or missing at that point in the war, including Emil J. Kapaun, the second chaplain of the war to be awarded a Distinguished Service Cross.

=== US response ===
The incident was one of the first of a series of atrocities the US forces accused KPA soldiers of committing. After the Chaplain–Medic, Hill 303 and Bloody Gulch massacres, US commanders established a commission on July 27 to investigate allegations of war crimes and collect evidence.

In late 1953, the United States Senate Committee on Government Operations, led by Joseph McCarthy, conducted an investigation of up to 1,800 reported incidents of war crimes allegedly committed throughout the Korean War. The Chaplain–Medic massacre was one of the first to be investigated, and it was here that the incident got its name. Buttrey, the lone survivor of the executions, was called to testify before the committee, and the US government concluded that the KPA violated the terms of the Geneva Convention, and condemned its actions.

In 1981, the United States erected a series of monuments in Arlington National Cemetery in Arlington, Virginia, listing the names of chaplains killed in various wars including World War II, the Korean War and the Vietnam War. Felhoelter's name was among those engraved in the memorial.

=== North Korean response ===
Subsequent research has found the KPA command did not directly order its troops to mistreat prisoners or unarmed wounded during the early phase of the war. The Chaplain–Medic massacre and similar atrocities are believed to have been conducted by "uncontrolled small units, by vindictive individuals, or because of unfavorable and increasingly desperate situations confronting the captors". The more KPA troops suffered from worsening conditions on the front lines, the more they mistreated American wounded and prisoners. T. R. Fehrenbach, a military historian, wrote in his analysis of the event that KPA troops committing these acts were probably accustomed to torture and execution of prisoners due to decades of rule by oppressive armies of the Empire of Japan up through World War II.

A July 28, 1950, order by General Ri Yong-ho, commander of the KPA 3rd Division, was intercepted by UN intelligence. The document was signed by Kim Chaek, Commander-in-Chief, and Choi Yong-kun, commander of the KPA Advanced General Headquarters, and stated that killing prisoners of war was "strictly prohibited". Lee directed individual units' Cultural Sections to inform the division's troops of the rule. The higher-profile Hill 303 massacre the next month prompted KPA division commanders to issue sterner orders on the treatment of prisoners of war.

== See also ==
- List of massacres in South Korea
- Roman Catholic Archdiocese for the Military Services, USA § Korean War
- Seoul National University Hospital massacre
