= Remembered Prisoners of a Forgotten War =

2002 military history book by Lewis H. Carlson

Remembered Prisoners of a Forgotten War: An Oral History of Korean War POWs
- First United States edition
- Author: Lewis H. Carlson
- Language: English
- Subject: Korean War, prisoners of war
- Genres: Non-fiction, military history
- Publisher: St. Martin's Press
- Publication date: April 2002
- Publication place: United States
- Media type: print (hardback)
- Pages: 256
- ISBN: 978-0-312286-84-2
- OCLC: 1036807891
- Dewey Decimal: 951.904/27-dc21
- LC Class: DS921.C37 2002

Remembered Prisoners of a Forgotten War: An Oral History of Korean War POWs is a 2002 military history book by Lewis H. Carlson. Using first-hand testimonies by repatriated prisoners of war of their experiences in captivity in Korea, the book demystifies the general perception in the United States that Korean War POWs had been "brainwashed" by their captors, and had betrayed their country.

Carlson (1934–2022) was an American professor of history at Western Michigan University, and was also the author of We Were Each Other's Prisoners: An Oral History of World War II American and German Prisoners of War, published in 1997 by Basic Books.

Remembered Prisoners of a Forgotten War includes the following dedication:

This book is dedicated to Studs Terkel, whose oral histories so well illuminate the experiences of those Americans never found in history books, and to all former Korean War prisoners, that no one will again challenge their collective integrity and courage.

== Synopsis ==
Despite the fact that more than 40 percent of the 7,140 Americans taken prisoner during the Korean War died in captivity, the survivors remain the most maligned victims of all American wars. For more than a half century, the media, general public, and even scholars have classified literally hundreds of these former prisoners as "brainwashed" victims of a heinous enemy or, even worse, as "turncoats" who betrayed their country. In either case, those accused apparently lacked the "right stuff" America expected of her brave sons. The most notorious reinforcement of this condemnation appeared in the well-made but badly distorted 1962 film, The Manchurian Candidate, but ... countless novels and short stories, myriad news accounts, and even scholarly treatises perpetuated this negative image.

— Lewis H. Carlson, Preface, Remembered Prisoners of a Forgotten War.

Carlson explains that in the early 1950s, the Cold War and McCarthyism left the American public paranoid about the Red Menace and were quick to accuse returning POWs of collaborating with their communist captors. But the reality of the situation was that the primary goal of the prisoners was simply to survive under extreme and unbearable conditions. Carlson states that "their conduct, rather than manifesting personal or societal weaknesses, as their critics charged, was far more likely to reflect the changing conditions of their captivity."

Remembered Prisoners of a Forgotten War contains first-hand testimonies of over 40 repatriated prisoners of war detailing their experiences in captivity. These include accounts of starvation, disease, solitary confinement, abuse and torture. Several prominent events are covered in detail, including the Tiger Death March, which happened in October 1950 when over 800 prisoners were forced to march 100 miles in nine days, resulting in the death of almost two-thirds of them, and the mass killings of American POWs: the Hill 303 massacre, where 41 were executed on a hill above Waegwan in South Korea in August 1950, and the Sunch'ŏn Tunnel Massacre where almost 70 American prisoners were murdered outside a tunnel near Sunch'on in North Korea in October 1950.

== Reception ==
In a review in Leatherneck Magazine, US Marine captain and military historian Keith F. Kopets wrote that Remembered Prisoners of a Forgotten War is not just about memories, it is a "scholarship" that examines facts and opinions about the fate of the Korean War POWs. Kopets stated that "[w]hat Carlson has done, and done well, is set the record straight." Edwin B. Burgess described the POW narratives "remarkable for their forthrightness and matter-of-fact tone." Reviewing the book in Library Journal, Burgess described the prisoners' survival under such brutal conditions as "nothing short of amazing." He said Remembered Prisoners of a Forgotten War will "fit well" with mainstream narrative histories.

A review at Publishers Weekly described Remembered Prisoners of a Forgotten War as a "well-researched account" of what happened to American POWs in Korea. It stated that the book will appeal to historians and those associated with the conflict, but felt that general readers may find it "too weighted" in favor of first-hand testimonies. A reviewer at Kirkus Reviews called the book "informative and moving", but felt that Carlson's decision to use survivors' testimonies results in "an incomplete story" that is "no less biased than the egregious brainwashing films and news stories the vets justly abhor."

== Bibliography ==
- Carlson, Lewis H. (2002). Remembered Prisoners of a Forgotten War: An Oral History of Korean War POWs. St. Martin's Press. ISBN 978-0312286842.

== Selected works citing this book ==
- Ward, Thomas J. (2022). "The Army's Last Segregated Unit: Black Prisoners at Camp 5, North Korea". The Journal of African American History. 107 (1): 27–54. doi:10.1086/717347. S2CID 247221978.
- Wilson, Sandra (2021). "Why were there no war crimes trials for the Korean War?". Journal of Global History. 16 (2): 185–206. doi:10.1017/s1740022821000164. S2CID 235599277.
- Vrij, Aldert; Meissner, Christian A.; Fisher, Ronald P.; Kassin, Saul M; Morgan III, Charles A.; Kleinman, Steven M (2017). "Psychological Perspectives on Interrogation". Perspectives on Psychological Science. 12 (6): 927–955. doi:10.1177/1745691617706515. PMID 28934559. S2CID 5147951.
- Keene, Judith (2011). "Lost to Public Commemoration: American Veterans of the 'Forgotten' Korean War". Journal of Social History. 44 (4): 1095–1113. doi:10.1353/JSH.2011.0046. JSTOR 41305425. S2CID 143520102.
- Leigh, Helen Greene (2012). Sacrifices for Patriotism: A Korean Pow Remembers the Forgotten War. BalboaPress. ISBN 9781452556048.
- Couch, Jon (2011). Caged Heroes: American POW Experiences from the Revolutionary War to the Present. AuthorHouse. ISBN 9781467060424.
- Kelley, Beverly Merrill (2004). Reelpolitik II: Political Ideologies in '50s and '60s Films. Rowman & Littlefield. ISBN 9780742530416.
- Li, Xiaobing (2019). China's War in Korea: Strategic Culture and Geopolitics. Springer Nature. ISBN 9789813296756.
- Rowley, Arden A., ed. (2002). U.S. Prisoners of War in the Korean War: Their Treatment and Handling by the North Korean Army and the Chinese Communist Forces. Turner Publishing Company. ISBN 9781563118319.
