= Battle of Taegu =

Korean War battle in 1950

- Part of the Battle of Pusan Perimeter
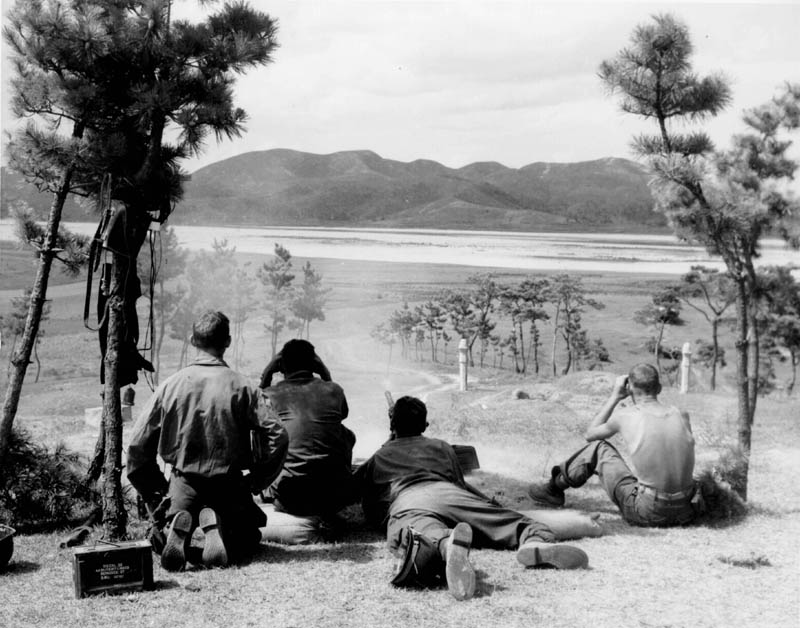
- U.S. 1st Cavalry Division soldiers fire at North Korean troops crossing the Naktong River
Date	August 5–20, 1950
Location	Outskirts of Taegu, South Korea 35.96°N 128.43°E
Result	United Nations victory

Belligerents
United Nations: United States; South Korea	North Korea

Commanders and leaders
Douglas MacArthur; Walton Walker	Choi Yong-kun; Kim Chaek

Strength
4 divisions	5 divisions

Casualties and losses
200 killed 400 wounded	3,700+ killed and wounded

The Battle of Taegu was an engagement between United Nations Command (UN) and North Korean forces early in the Korean War, with fighting continuing from August 5–20, 1950 around the city of Taegu, South Korea. It was a part of the Battle of Pusan Perimeter, and was one of several large engagements fought simultaneously. The battle ended in a victory for the UN after their forces were able to drive off an offensive by Korean People's Army (KPA) divisions attempting to cross the Naktong River and assault the city.

Five KPA divisions massed around the city preparing to cross the Naktong River and assault it from the north and west. Defending the city were the US 1st Cavalry Division and Republic of Korea Army (ROKA) II Corps. In a series of engagements, each of the KPA divisions attempted to cross the Naktong and attack the defending forces. The success of these attacks varied, with attacks in the 1st Cavalry Division sector repulsed while attacks in the ROK sector were more successful.

During the battle, KPA troops were able to surprise US troops on Hill 303 and capture them. Late in the battle, these US troops were machine gunned in the Hill 303 massacre. The UN forces were successful in driving most of the KPA off and the city was finally secured in the Battle of the Bowling Alley.

== Background ==
=== Outbreak of war ===
Following the invasion of South Korea by North Korea and the outbreak of the Korean War on June 25, 1950, the United Nations Security Council voted to send armed forces to defend South Korea. The United States, a permanent member of the Security Council, immediately deployed armed forces (US Navy and US Air Force (USAF) units) to southeastern South Korea because of their immediate availability from their bases in Japan and Okinawa, where the military occupation of Japan was still in effect. Countries such as Australia, Canada, New Zealand, and the United Kingdom all quickly contributed naval ships in support of the UN action.

The initial goal of the American armed forces was to support the remnants of the ROKA in stemming the North Korean invasion (but only in the southeastern part of South Korea, around the major seaport of Pusan) to prevent the complete collapse of the ROKA and of the South Korean Government. However, the UN commander, General Douglas MacArthur, after an inspection trip to South Korea, realised US Army ground forces would need to be committed.

At the time of the North Korean invasion, the closest US ground force was the 24th Infantry Division, which was based in Japan. This division had fewer than its normal contingent of soldiers, and most of its equipment was rather old due to the U.S. Congress's reductions in military spending. In any case, the 24th Infantry Division was the only part of the US Army that was available to quickly reinforce South Korea.

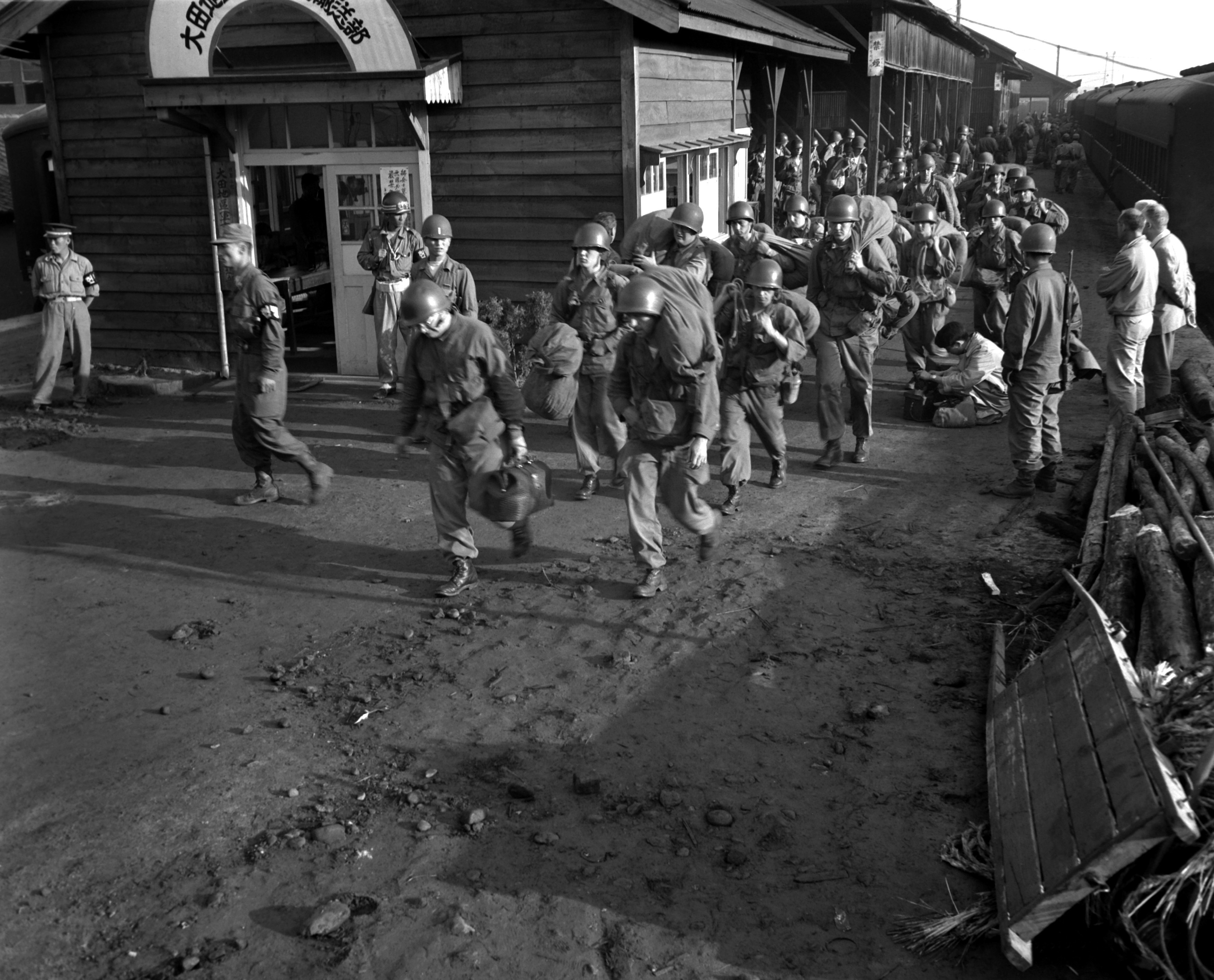
Task Force Smith arrives in South Korea.

Thus, the 24th Infantry Division was the first American armed force sent to South Korea with the mission to blunt the advance of the KPA and to set up a defensive perimeter around Pusan (the Pusan Perimeter) with the aid of USAF, US Navy and United States Marine Corps aviation forces. MacArthur decided to have his US and ROK troops to dig in around Pusan and hold on until he could assemble a powerful force (the X Corps) to make an amphibious counterattack at Inchon on the northwestern coast of South Korea, near Seoul, later on in 1950. The 24th Infantry Division, along with the ROKA held out inside the Pusan Perimeter and awaited reinforcements and counterattacks against the KPA.

Among the US units that reinforced the Pusan Perimeter as soon as they could arrive were the 1st Cavalry Division, the 2nd Infantry Division the 7th Infantry Division and the 25th Infantry Divisions, along with other units of the US Eighth Army that provided logistical, medical, and intelligence support. Advance units of the 24th Infantry Division were badly defeated in the Battle of Osan on July 5 in the first encounter between US and KPA troops. For the first month after the defeat at Osan, the 24th Division was repeatedly pushed back and forced southeastward by larger numbers of KPA troops equipped with rugged Soviet-made T-34 tanks.

The troops of the 24th Division were systematically pushed southeast in the Battle of Chochiwon, the Battle of Chonan, and the Battle of Pyongtaek, as well as in smaller engagements. The 24th Division made a desperate stand against the KPA in the Battle of Taejon, where it was badly battered, but it delayed the KPA advance until July 20. By that time, the Eighth Army's force of combat troops was roughly equal in numbers to KPA forces attacking the Pusan Perimeter, with new UN forces arriving from America, Australia, New Zealand, etc., nearly every day.

=== North Korean advance ===
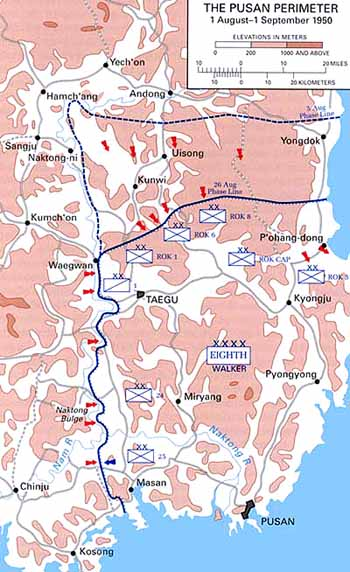
Tactical map of the Pusan Perimeter in August 1950. The fight at P'ohang-dong occurred between North and South Korean forces on the northeastern line.

With the city of Taejon captured, the KPA began surrounding the Pusan Perimeter on the north and the west in an attempt to crush it. The KPA 4th and 6th Infantry Divisions advanced south in a wide flanking maneuver. These two KPA divisions attempted to turn the UN left flank in order to capture Pusan from the southwest, but they became dispersed in the process. They were also exposed to repeated air attacks from the USAF and the US Navy. The KPA attacked the US troops with superior numbers at first, and with T-34 tanks, but despite local defeats, the UN troops, with the help of aviation and naval units were able to extend the Pusan Perimeter all the way south to the East China Sea and to blunt all KPA attacks toward Pusan. American air supremacy over the Pusan Perimeter was a significant factor in helping the UN ground forces maintain their positions.

UN forces were pushed back repeatedly before finally halting the KPA advance in a series of battles around the edges of the Pusan Perimeter. Forces of the 3rd Battalion, 29th Infantry, newly arrived in the country, were wiped out at Hadong in a coordinated ambush by KPA forces on July 27, opening a pass to the Pusan area. Soon after, KPA forces took Chinju to the west, pushing back the US 19th Infantry Regiment and leaving routes to the Pusan open for more KPA attacks. US formations were subsequently able to defeat and push back the KPA on the flank in the Battle of the Notch on August 2. Suffering mounting losses, the KPA force in the west withdrew for several days to re-equip and receive reinforcements. This granted both sides a reprieve to prepare for the attack on the Pusan Perimeter.

=== Taegu ===
In the meantime, Eighth Army commander Lieutenant general Walton Walker had established Taegu as the Eighth Army's headquarters. Right at the center of the Pusan Perimeter, Taegu stood at the entrance to the Naktong River valley, an area where KPA forces could advance in large numbers in close support. The natural barriers provided by the Naktong River to the south and the mountainous terrain to the north converged around Taegu, which was also the major transportation hub and last major South Korean city aside from Pusan itself to remain in UN hands. From south to north, the city was defended by the 1st Cavalry Division and the ROKA 1st and 6th Divisions of ROKA II Corps. The 1st Cavalry Division was spread out along a long line along the Naktong River to the south, with its 5th and 8th Cavalry Regiments holding a 24 km (15 mi) line along the river south of Waegwan, facing west. The 7th Cavalry Regiment held position to the east in reserve, along with artillery forces, ready to reinforce anywhere a crossing could be attempted. The ROKA 1st Division held a northwest-facing line in the mountains immediately north of the city while the ROK 6th Division held position to the east, guarding the narrow valley holding the Kunwi road into the Pusan Perimeter area.

Five KPA divisions amassed to oppose the UN at Taegu. From south to north, the 10th, 3rd, 15th, 13th, and 1st Divisions occupied a wide line encircling Taegu from Tuksong-dong and around Waegwan to Kunwi. The KPA planned to use the natural corridor of the Naktong valley from Sangju to Taegu as its main axis of attack for the next push south, so the divisions all eventually moved through this valley, crossing the Naktong at different areas along the low ground. Elements of the 105th Armored Division also supported the attack.

== Battle ==
On the night of August 4 to 5, the KPA 13th Division began crossing the Naktong River at Naktong-ni, 40 miles (64 km) northwest of Taegu. The crossing was not discovered until August 5 when ROKA artillery and mortar fire was called on the crossing. Over the course of three nights, KPA soldiers from the division's three regiments crossed the river on rafts or by wading, carrying their weapons and equipment over their heads. The entire division was across by August 7, and assembling several miles from the ROKA 1st Division's prepared defenses.

At the same time, the KPA 1st Division crossed the river on barges between Hamch'ang and Sangju, in the ROK 6th Division's sector from August 6 to 8. This attack was discovered quickly by US reconnaissance planes and the KPA 1st Division was immediately engaged by the ROKA forces. The two divisions locked in battle around Kunwi until August 17, with the KPA division facing stubborn resistance, heavy air attacks, and heavy casualties.

=== Opening moves ===
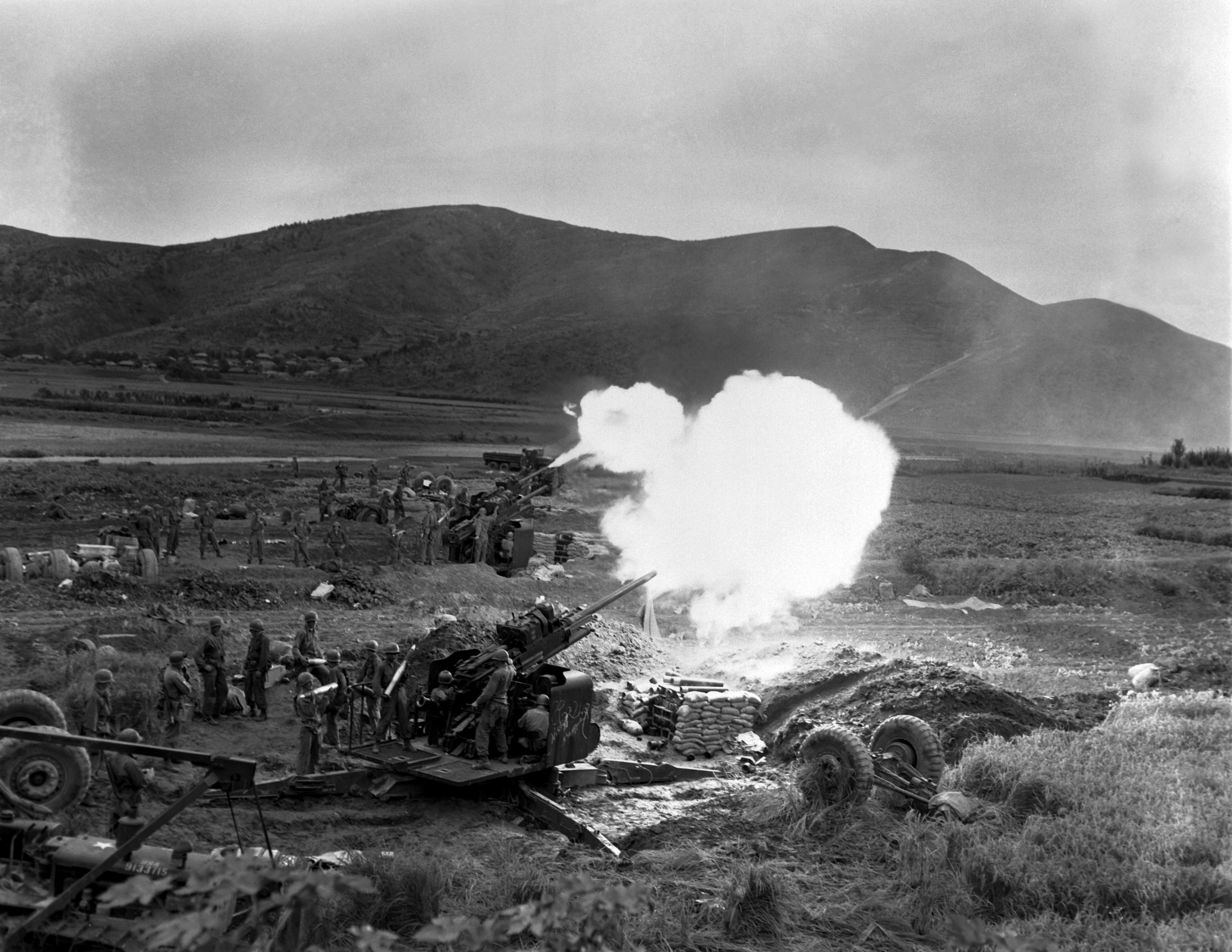
ROK artillery supporting the ROK 1st Division fires near Taegu. Note that the guns are in fact 90 mm Anti-Aircraft guns.

ROKA troops attacked the 13th Division immediately after it completed its crossing, forcing scattered KPA troops into the mountains. The division reassembled to the east and launched a concerted night attack, broke the ROKA defenses, and began an advance that carried it 20 mi (32 km) southeast of Naktong-ni on the main road to Taegu. Within a week, the KPA 1st and 13th Divisions were converging on the Tabu-dong area, about 15 mi (24 km) north of Taegu.

The KPA 15th Division, the next of the KPA divisions in the line to the south, received 1,500 replacements at Kumch'on on August 5, which brought its strength to about 6,500 troops. On the next day, its 45th Regiment marched northeast toward the Naktong River. This regiment passed through Sonsan on August 7 and crossed the river southeast of that town while under attack by US aircraft. Once across the river, this regiment headed into the mountains, initially encountering no opposition. Its other two regiments, the 48th and 50th, departed from Kumch'on later and began crossing the Naktong between Indong and Waegwan before dawn of August 8, constructing underwater bridges for their vehicles. The KPA supported this crossing by direct tank fire from the western side of the river. These tanks next carried out their own river crossing during the day. The KPA 15th Division seized Hills 201 and 346 on the east side of the river at the crossing site before advancing eastward into the mountains toward Tabu-dong, 7 mi (11 km) away. On the next day, the ROKA 1st Division regained the high ground at the crossing sites, driving the KPA forces further eastward into the mountains. From August 12 through 16, the three regiments of the KPA 15th Division united on the east side of the Naktong River in the vicinity of Yuhak-san, 5 mi (8 km) east of the crossing site and 3 mi (5 km) northwest of Tabu-dong. The KPA 13th Division quickly locked in combat on Yuhak-san with the ROKA 1st Division.

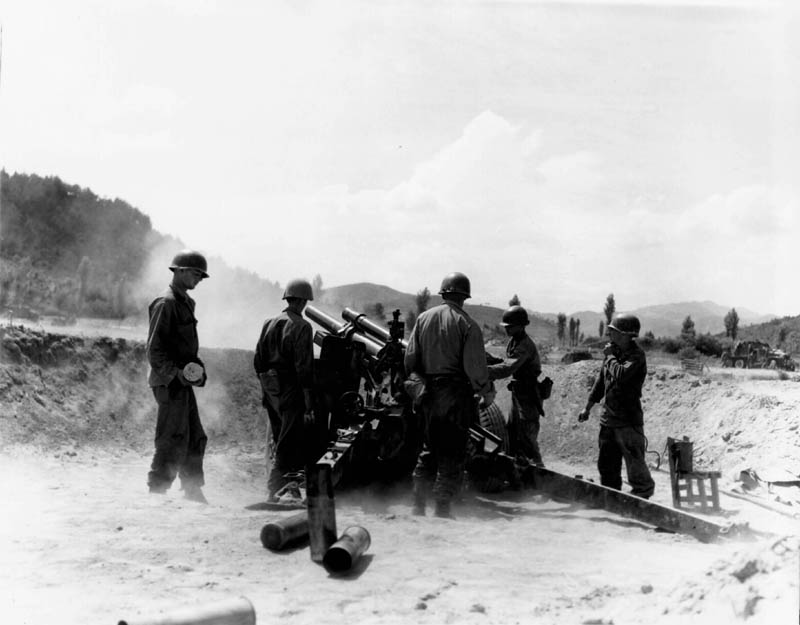
US Artillery near Waegwan fires at North Korean troops attempting to cross the Naktong River

South of Waegwan, two more KPA divisions stood ready to cross the Naktong in a coordinated attack with the divisions to the north. The experienced KPA 3rd Division, concentrated in the vicinity of Songju, and the untested KPA 10th Division, concentrated in the Koryong area, and both mobilized for an attack. These two divisions crossed in the 1st Cavalry Division's sector. The KPA 3rd Division's 7th Regiment started crossing the Naktong at about 03:00 on August 9 near Noch'on, 2 mi (3 km) south of the Waegwan bridge. After discovering this crossing, units of the 5th Cavalry Regiment directed automatic-weapon fire against the KPA units and also called in pre-registered artillery fire on the crossing site. Although the KPA regiment suffered some casualties, the bulk of it reached the east bank and then moved inland into the hills. About 30 minutes later, the 8th and 9th Regiments began crossing the river to the south. The 5th Cavalry Regiment and all its supporting mortars and artillery, now fully alerted, spotted and decimated the troops of the two regiments and turned them back to the west bank. Only a small number of KPA reached the eastern side. From there, they were either captured by the UN troops or hid out until the next night – when they retreated across the river.

=== Triangulation Hill ===
At dawn on August 9, the 1st Cavalry Division commander, Major general Hobart R. Gay at his headquarters in Taegu learned of the KPA's river crossing in the area of his division south of Waegwan. Since the first reports were vague, Gay decided to withhold counterattack until he learned more about the situation. He quickly learned that around 750 KPA infantry troops had gathered on Hill 268 (35.96°N 128.426°E), also known as "Triangulation Hill", which was 3 mi (5 km) southeast of Waegwan and 10 mi (16 km) northwest of Taegu. Gay ordered his division to counterattack the enemy gathering to force them across the river. He and Walker thought that this attack could be a feint, and that the KPA could be planning a larger attack to their north. Furthermore, the hill was important because of its proximity to the lines of supply. The main Korean north–south highway and the main Seoul-Pusan railroad skirted the base of Triangulation Hill.

At about 09:30, Gay ordered the 1st Battalion of the 7th Cavalry, to counter the KPA penetration. This battalion moved from its bivouac area just outside Taegu, accompanied by five tanks of A Company, 71st Heavy Tank Battalion. This motorized force proceeded to the foot of Hill 268. Meanwhile, the 61st Field Artillery Battalion shelled the hill heavily.

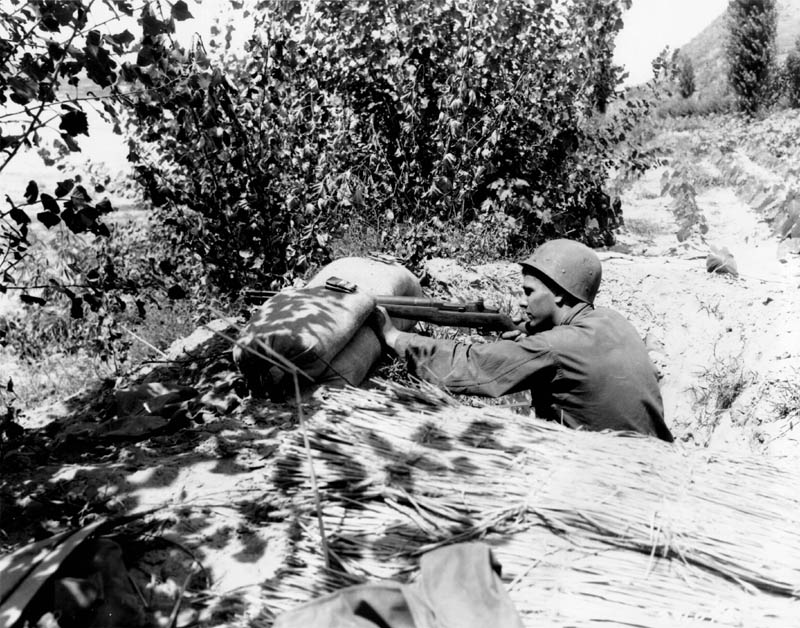
A 1st Cavalry Division soldier fires at North Korean positions along the Naktong River, August 13

At about 12:00 the artillery fired a preparation on Hill 268, and the 1st Battalion next attacked it with orders to continue on southwest to Hill 154. Hill 268 was covered with thick brush from about 4 ft (1 m) and trees eight to 10 ft (3 m) high. The day was very hot, and many of the American soldiers collapsed from heat exhaustion during the attack, which was not well-coordinated with the artillery fire. The KPA repulsed the attack.

On the next morning, August 10, air raids and artillery rocked Hill 268, devastating the KPA battalion. That afternoon, Gay ordered the five American tanks to move along the Waegwan road until they could fire onto the hill from the northwest into its reverse slope. This tank-gun fire caught the KPA troops unprepared while they were hiding from the artillery fire. Trapped between the two barrages, they started to vacate their positions. An American infantry attack next reached the crest of the Hill 268 without much trouble, and this battle was over by about 16:00. US artillery and mortar fire was now shifted westward, and this cut off the KPA retreat. White phosphorus shells fired from the 61st Field Artillery Battalion caught KPA troops in a village while they attempted to retreat, and they were then routed by US infantry, suffering over 200 killed. That evening the 1st Battalion, 7th Cavalry, returned to the serve as the division reserve, and elements of the 5th Cavalry finished securing Hill 268.

The KPA 7th Regiment, 3rd Division had been destroyed on the hill. The 1st Battalion, 7th Cavalry suffered 14 men killed and another 48 wounded in the two-day battle. About 1,000 men of the 7th Regiment had crossed the Naktong to Hill 268, and about 700 of them became casualties. Artillery and mortars had inflicted most of the crippling casualties on the regiment. After crossing to the east side of the Naktong, the regiment had received no food or ammunition supply. An estimated 300 survivors retreated across the river the night of August 10–11. The KPA 3rd Division's attempted crossing of the Naktong south of Waegwan had ended in catastrophe. When the survivors of the 7th Regiment rejoined the division on or about August 12, the once powerful 3rd Division was reduced to a disorganized unit of only about 2,500 troops. The KPA placed this division in reserve to be rebuilt by replacements.

=== Yongp'o crossing ===
The KPA plan for the attack against Taegu from the west and southwest demanded that the KPA 10th Division make a coordinated attack with the KPA 3rd Division. The 10th Division, so far untested in combat, had started from Sukch'on for the front by rail on July 25. At Chonan it left the trains and continued south on foot through Taejon, arriving at the Naktong opposite Waegwan around August 8. The division was ordered to cross the Naktong River in the vicinity of Tuksong-dong, penetrate east, and cut the main supply route of the UN troops from Pusan to Taegu. The division assembled in the Koryong area on August 11.

Two regiments of the KPA 10th Division, the 29th to the south and the 25th to the north, were to make the assault crossing with the 27th Regiment in reserve. The 2nd Battalion, 29th Regiment, was the first unit of the division to cross the river. Its troops waded across undetected during the night of August 11/12, west of Hyongp'ung. It then occupied Hill 265, a northern spur of Hill 409 (35.676°N 128.413°E), 2 mi (3.2 km) southwest of Hyongp'ung, and set up machine gun positions. The other two battalions followed it and occupied Hill 409. The KPA on Hill 409 soon ambushed a patrol from the 21st Infantry Regiment, 24th Infantry Division, which was moving north and trying to establish contact with the 7th Cavalry Regiment during the Battle of the Naktong Bulge occurring simultaneously to the south.

Further north, the 25th Regiment started crossing the Naktong around 03:00 on August 12, in the vicinity of Tuksong-dong, on the Koryong-Taegu road. The 2nd Battalion, 7th Cavalry Regiment, covered this crossing site, which was 14 mi (23 km) southwest of Taegu. By daylight, a KPA force of 300 to 400 had penetrated to Wich'on-dong and 2nd Battalion's H Company engaged it in close combat. In a grenade and automatic weapons attack, the KPA overran the advance positions of the company, the mortar observation post, and the heavy machine gun positions. The KPA were apparently attempting to control high ground east of Yongp'o in order to provide protection for the main crossing that was to follow. By 09:00, however, the 2nd Battalion, supported by the 77th Field Artillery Battalion and air strikes, drove the KPA back through Yongp'o and dispersed them.

=== Second Yongp'o attack ===
In the three days from August 10 to 12, the Naktong River had dropped 3 ft (0.91 m) in depth and it was only shoulder-deep at many places due to the lack of rain and the torrid weather. This made any attempt at crossing the river considerably easier.

A more determined KPA crossing of the Naktong in the vicinity of the blown bridge between Tuksong-dong and Yongp'o began early in the morning on August 14. By 06:20, about 500 KPA soldiers had penetrated as far as Yongp'o. Fifteen minutes later, 2nd Battalion, 7th Cavalry soldiers engaged the KPA at Wich'on-dong, 1 mi (1.6 km) east of the crossing site. At 08:00, Gay ordered 1st Battalion, 7th Cavalry to move to the Yongp'o area to support the 2nd Battalion.

KPA artillery and tank fire from the west side of the river supported the infantry crossing. A large number of KPA reinforcements were crossing in barges near the bridge, while under fire from US air strikes and artillery. This attack also stalled, with the deepest KPA penetration reaching Samuni-dong, 1.5 mi (2.4 km) beyond the blown-up bridge. From there the combined fire of US light weapons, mortars and artillery drove them back to the river. By noon, large groups of KPA were trying to recross the river to the west side as American artillery continued hammering them, causing heavy casualties.

By nightfall, the 7th Cavalry Regiment had eliminated the KPA bridgehead at Yongp'o. In the fight, the only major one to take place along the Naktong at a prefabricated crossing site, the 25th and 27th Regiments of the KPA 10th Division suffered crippling losses. The 7th Cavalry estimated that of 1,700 KPA troops that had succeeded in crossing the river, 1,500 had been killed. Two days after the battle, H Company reported it had buried 267 KPA dead behind its lines. In front of its position, G Company counted 150 KPA dead. In contrast, G Company suffered only two men killed and three wounded during the battle. In its first combat mission, the crossing of the Naktong, the 10th Division suffered 2,500 casualties.

=== Hill 303 ===
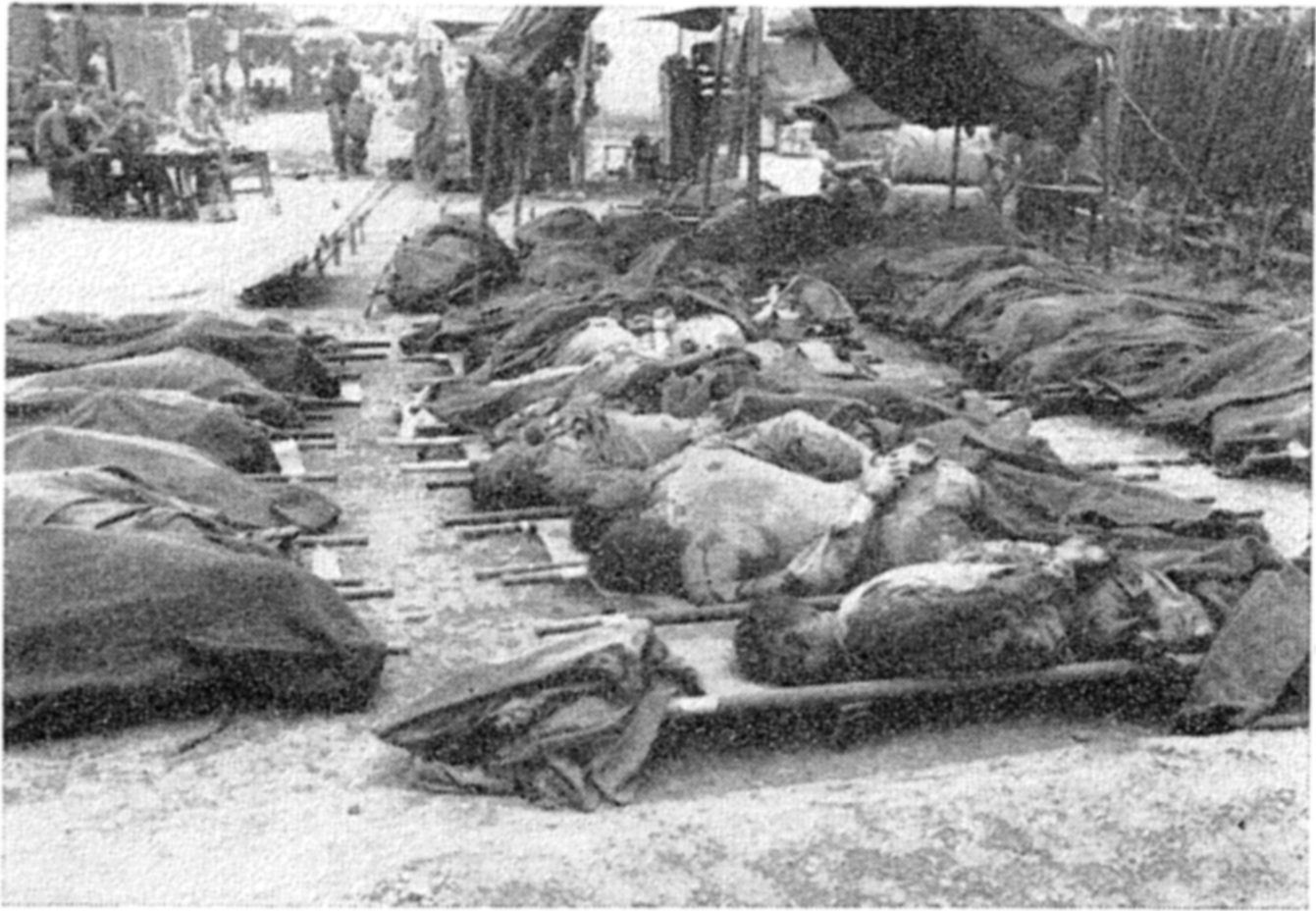
Bodies of massacre victims gathered near Waegwan, South Korea, many with their hands still bound

Almost simultaneously with the KPA 10th Division's crossing in the southern part of the 1st Cavalry Division sector at Tuksong-dong and Yongp'o, another was taking place northward above Waegwan near the boundary between the division's sector and the ROK 1st Division's sector. The northernmost unit of the 1st Cavalry Division was G Company, 5th Cavalry Regiment. It held Hill 303, the furthest position on the Eighth Army's extreme right flank.

For several days UN intelligence sources had reported heavy KPA concentrations across the Naktong opposite the ROKA 1st Division. Early in the morning on August 14, a KPA regiment crossed the Naktong 6 mi (9.7 km) north of Waegwan into the ROK 1st Division sector through an underwater bridge. Shortly after midnight that night, ROKA forces on the high ground just north of the US-ROKA boundary were attacked by this force. After daylight an air strike partially destroyed the underwater bridge. The KPA attack spread south and by 12:00 KPA small-arms fire fell on G Company, 5th Cavalry Regiment, on Hill 303. Instead of moving east into the mountains as other landings had, this force turned south and headed for Waegwan.

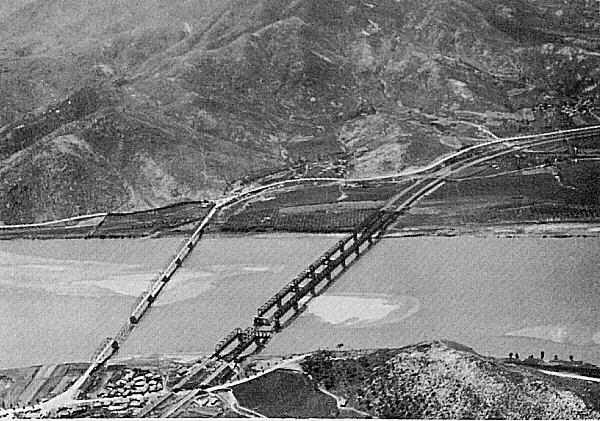
The Waegwon Bridge crossing of the Naktong River. Hill 303 is visible on the bottom right

Early in the morning on August 15, G Company men on Hill 303 spotted 50 KPA infantry supported by two T-34 tanks moving south along the river road at the base of the hill. They also spotted another column moving to their rear which quickly engaged F Company with small arms fire. In order to escape the enemy encirclement, F Company withdrew south, but G Company did not. By 08:30, the KPA had completely surrounded it and a supporting platoon of H Company mortarmen on Hill 303. A relief column, composed of B Company, 5th Cavalry and a platoon of US tanks tried to reach G Company, but was unable to penetrate the KPA force that was surrounding Hill 303.

Later that day, B Company and the tanks tried again to retake the hill, now estimated to contain a 700-man battalion. The 61st Field Artillery Battalion and elements of the 82nd Field Artillery Battalion, fired on the hill during the day. During the night, G Company succeeded in escaping from Hill 303. Before dawn on the 17th, troops from both the 1st and 2nd Battalions of the 5th Cavalry Regiment, supported by A Company of the 70th Tank Battalion, attacked Hill 303, but heavy KPA mortar fire stopped them at the edge of Waegwan. During the morning, heavy artillery preparations pounded the KPA positions on the hill.

At 14:00 an air strike came in, attacking the hill with napalm, conventional bombs, rockets and machine guns. The air strike and artillery bombardment were successful in pushing the KPA off the hill. After the strike, the infantry attacked up the hill at 15:30 unopposed and secured it by 16:30. The combined strength of E and F Companies on top of the hill was about sixty men. The artillery and the air attacks killed and wounded an estimated 500 enemy troops on Hill 303, with survivors fleeing in a complete rout.

In regaining Hill 303 on August 17, the 5th Cavalry Regiment discovered the bodies of 26 mortarmen of H Company, hands tied in back, with gunshot wounds to the back. First knowledge of the event came in the afternoon when scouts brought in a man from Hill 303, Private Roy Manring of the Heavy Mortar Platoon, who had been wounded by automatic weapons fire. Manring had crawled down the hill until he saw scouts of the attacking force. In all about 45 men were shot by the KPA in the event, of which only five survived. The total number of men executed around Hill 303 is unclear, as several more men were subsequently discovered in other locations around the hill with evidence of execution. Angered, General Douglas MacArthur, commander of UN forces in Korea, broadcast a warning to North Korean leaders they would be held accountable for the atrocity. However intercepted documents show the KPA command was also concerned with the conduct of its troops and issued orders to limit killing of Prisoners of War.

=== Carpet bombing ===
In the mountains northeast of Waegwan and Hill 303, the ROKA 1st Division continued to suffer KPA attacks throughout mid-August. KPA pressure against the ROKA 1st Division never ceased for long. Under the command of Brigadier general Paik Sun Yup, this division fought an extremely bloody defense of the mountain approaches to Taegu. US planners believed the main KPA attack would come from west, and so the US command massed its forces to the west of Taegu. The US command mistakenly believed up to 40,000 KPA troops were near Taegu. This number was above the actual troop numbers for the KPA, which had only 70,000 men along the entire perimeter. US artillery fire from the 1st Cavalry Division sector supported the ROKA in this area. The division's 13th Regiment still held some positions along the river, while the 11th and 12th Regiments battled the KPA in the high mountain masses of Suam-san and Yuhak-san, west and northwest of Tabu-dong and 4 mi (6.4 km) to 6 mi (9.7 km) east of the Naktong River. The KPA continued to use the underwater bridge across the Naktong 6 mi (9.7 km) north of Waegwan as their major route for supply and reinforcements. UN forces continued to target this bridge, even scoring a direct hit with a 155mm howitzer, but it was not seriously damaged.

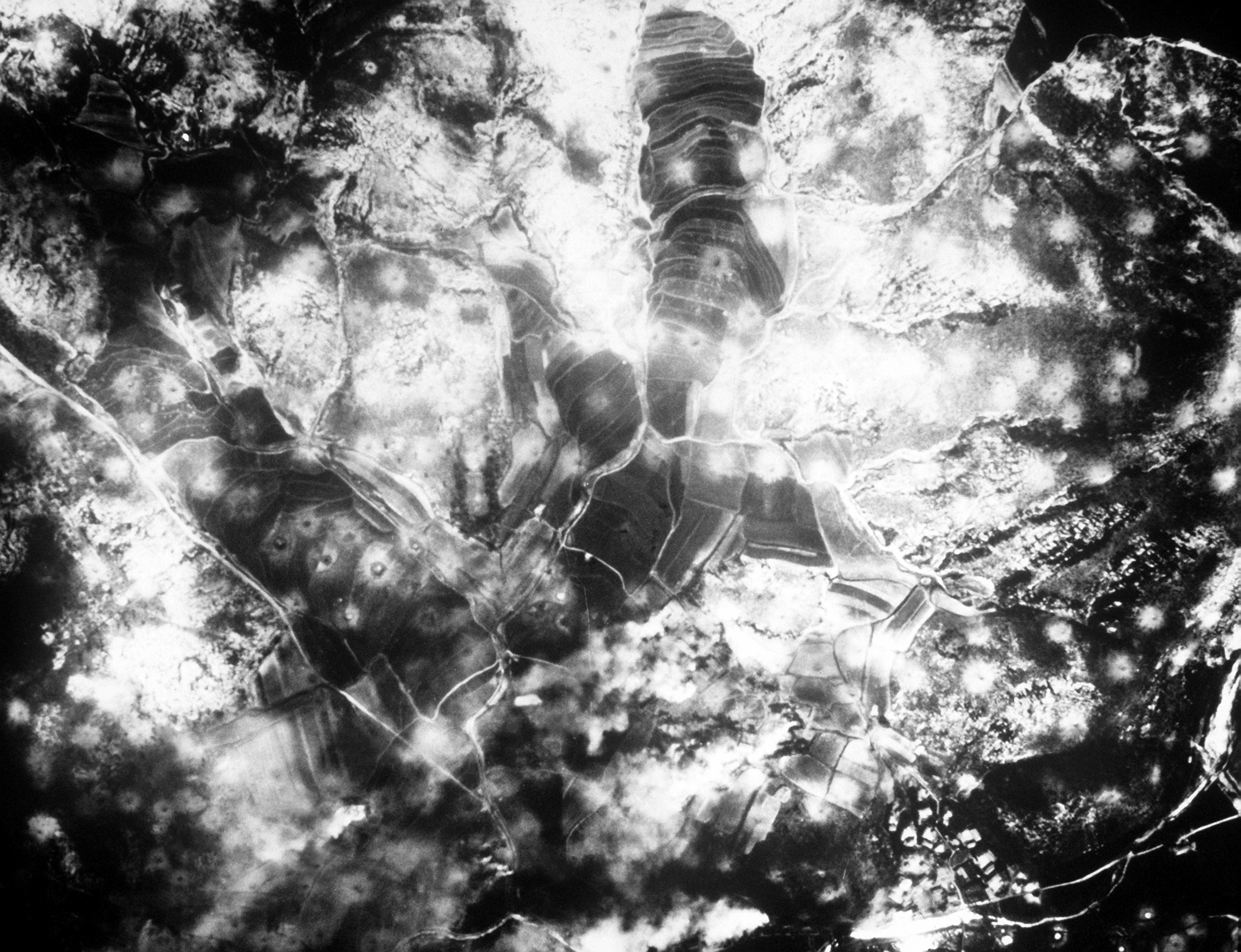
US Air Force bombers drop heavy ordnance near Waegwan.

Through the middle of August, KPA forces relentlessly attacked the sectors occupied by the ROKA 13th Regiment and the US 5th Cavalry Regiment. This assault, together with increasingly heavy pressure against the main force of the ROKA 1st Division in the Tabu-dong area, began to endanger the UN control of Taegu. On August 16, 750 South Korean police were stationed on the outskirts of the city to reinforce faltering military lines. Refugees had swollen Taegu's normal population of 300,000 to 700,000. A crisis seemed to be developing among the people on August 18 when several KPA artillery shells landed in Taegu. The shells, falling near the railroad station, damaged the roundhouse, destroyed one yard engine, killed one Korean civilian, and wounded eight others. The Korean Provincial Government subsequently ordered the evacuation of Taegu, and President of South Korea Syngman Rhee moved the national leaders to Pusan. Following the evacuation order, swarms of panicked South Korean refugees began to pour out on the roads leading from the city, threatening to stop all military traffic, but Eighth Army eventually halted the evacuations.

On August 14, MacArthur ordered Lieutenant general George E. Stratemeyer to conduct a carpet bombing of a 27 sq mi (70 km^{2}) rectangular area on the west side of the Naktong River opposite the ROKA 1st Division. Intelligence estimates placed the greatest concentrations of enemy troops in this area, some estimates being as high as four KPA divisions and several armored regiments, totalling 40,000 men, who were reportedly using the area to stage their attack on Taegu. Gay, commanding the 1st Cavalry Division, repeatedly requested that the bombing include the area northeast of Waegwan. This request was denied because of fear that bombing there might cause casualties among the 1st Cavalry and ROK 1st Division troops. Stratemeyer did not think his aircraft could successfully carpet bomb an area larger than 3 mi (4.8 km) square but he complied with MacArthur's order anyway.

At 11:58, on August 16, the first of the 98 B-29 Superfortresses of the 19th, 22nd, 92nd, 98th and 307th Bomber Groups arrived over the target area from their Far East Air Force bases in Japan and Okinawa. The last planes cleared the target at 12:24. The bombers from 10,000 ft (3,000 m) dropped approximately 960 tons of 500- and 1,000-pound bombs. The attack had required the entirety of the FEAF bombing component, and they had dropped 3,084 500 lb (230 kg) bombs and 150 1,000 lb (450 kg) bombs. This comprised the largest USAF operation since the Battle of Normandy in World War II.

Walker reported to MacArthur the next day that the damage done to the KPA by the bombing could not be evaluated because of smoke and dust, and ground forces could not reach it because of KPA fire. Information obtained later from KPA prisoners revealed the enemy divisions the Far East Command thought to be still west of the Naktong had already crossed to the east side and were not in the bombed area. No evidence was found that the bombing killed a single KPA soldier. However, the bombing seems to have destroyed a significant number of KPA artillery batteries. The UN ground and air commanders opposed future massive carpet bombing attacks unless there was precise information on an enemy concentration and the situation was critical. Instead, they recommended fighter-bombers and dive bombers would better support ground forces. They subsequently canceled a second bombing of an area east of the Naktong scheduled for August 19.

== Aftermath ==
The battles around Taegu saw repeated attempts by the KPA to attack the city. However, the KPA were repeatedly stopped or slowed by US and ROKA troops and airstrikes. The five KPA divisions each suffered heavy casualties, and each of them finally collapsed under the strain of both mounting losses and lack of supplies. However, some of these division's troops were able to disperse into the mountains. Some of these troops later assembled for different battles. These final elements of the KPA were finally defeated in the Battle of the Bowling Alley.

Casualties among the 1st Cavalry Division were relatively light. This division suffered a total of about 600 casualties, with around 200 killed in action, including those at Hill 303. American forces in established positions were able to decimate KPA units crossing the Naktong in the open with their artillery fire and air attacks. The exact numbers of soldiers captured and executed compared with those killed in combat are difficult to determine, because of conflicting accounts of how many prisoners were actually held on Hill 303. The KPA suffered much higher casualties, and also a much higher percentage of them killed in action (KIA). This included 2,500 at Yongp'o, 500 at Hill 303, and 700 on Triangulation Hill. This places the total killed at over 3,700 troops, though the exact number of casualties is unknown in the carpet-bombing operation because the patrols of the UN troops were unable to reconnoitre this area until much later.
