= Hill 303 massacre =

1950 massacre in Waegwan, South Korea

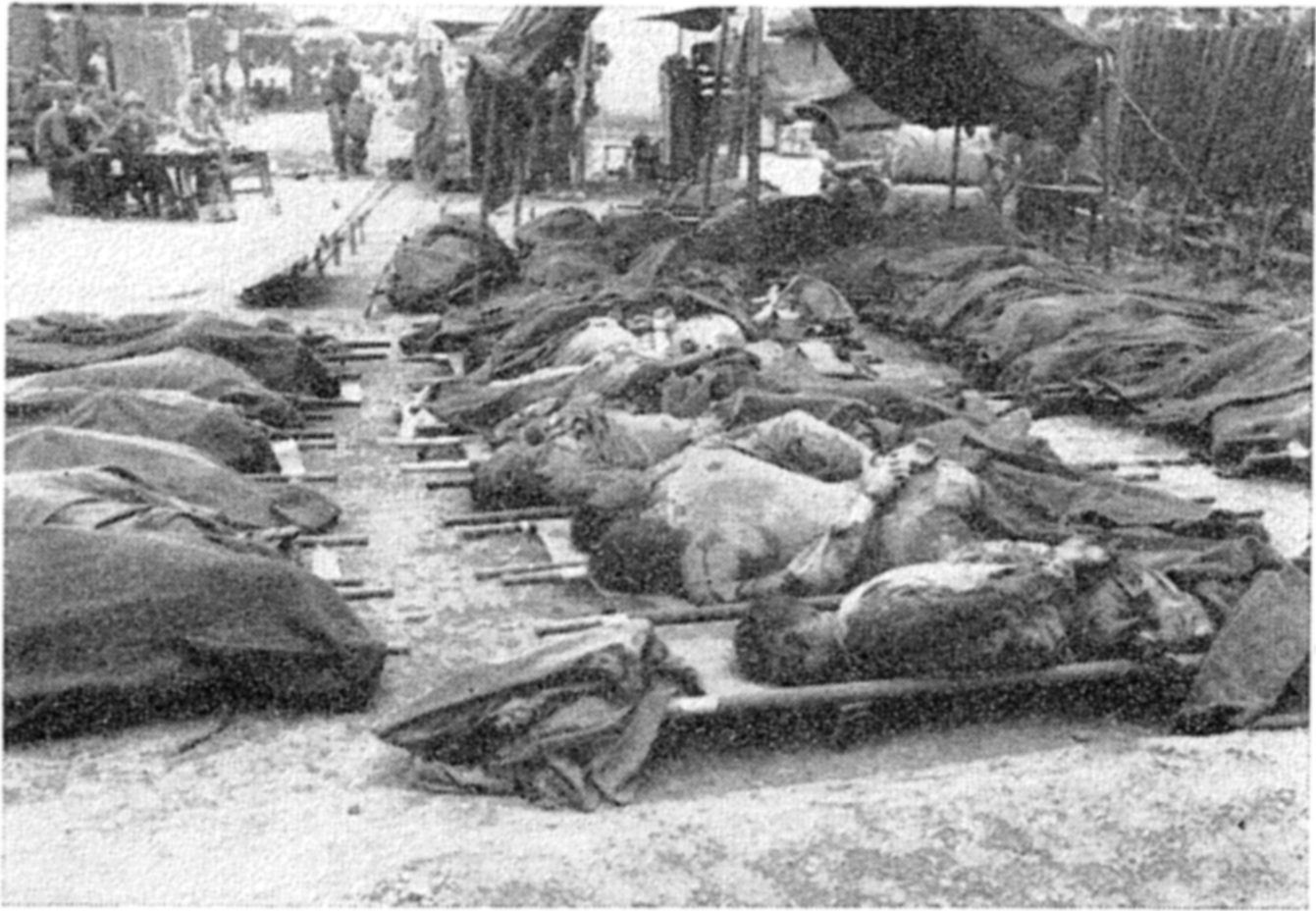
- Bodies of massacre victims gathered near Waegwan, South Korea, many with their hands still bound
- Location: 36.0124°N 128.4115°E; Hill 303, Waegwan, South Korea
- Date: August 17, 1950; 76 years ago 14:00 (KST)
- Target: U.S. Army prisoners of war
- Attack type: Summary executions
- Deaths: 42 prisoners executed
- Injuries: 4–5 prisoners wounded
- Perpetrator: North Korean army soldiers

The Hill 303 massacre (Korean: 303 고지 학살 사건) was a massacre that took place during the opening days of the Korean War on August 17, 1950, on a hill above Waegwan, Republic of Korea. Forty-one United States Army (US) prisoners of war were murdered by troops of the North Korean People's Army (KPA) during one of the engagements of the Battle of Pusan Perimeter.

Operating near Taegu during the Battle of Taegu, elements of the US 2nd Battalion, 5th Cavalry Regiment, 1st Cavalry Division, were surrounded by KPA troops crossing the Nakdong River at Hill 303. Most of the US troops were able to escape, but one platoon of mortarmen misidentified KPA troops as Republic of Korea Army (ROK) reinforcements and was captured. KPA troops held the Americans on the hill and initially tried to move them across the river and out of the battle, but they were unable to do so because of a heavy counterattack. US forces eventually broke the KPA advance, routing the force. As the KPA began to retreat, one of their officers ordered the prisoners to be shot so they would not slow them down.

The massacre provoked a response from both sides in the conflict. US commanders broadcast radio messages and dropped leaflets demanding the senior North Korean commanders be held responsible for the atrocity. The KPA commanders, concerned about the way their soldiers were treating prisoners of war, laid out stricter guidelines for handling enemy captives. Memorials were later constructed on Hill 303 by troops at nearby Camp Carroll to honor the victims of the massacre.

== Background ==
=== Korean War begins ===
Following the invasion of South Korea by North Korea, and the subsequent outbreak of the Korean War on June 25, 1950, the United Nations (UN) decided to enter the conflict on behalf of South Korea. The United States, a member of the UN, subsequently committed ground forces to the Korean Peninsula with the goal of fighting back the North Korean invasion and to prevent South Korea from collapsing.

The 24th Infantry Division was the first US unit sent into Korea. The unit was to take the initial "shock" of KPA advances, delaying much larger KPA units to buy time to allow reinforcements to arrive. The division was consequently alone for several weeks as it attempted to delay the KPA, making time for the 1st Cavalry and the 7th and 25th Infantry Divisions, along with other Eighth United States Army supporting units, to move into position. Advance elements of the 24th Infantry, known as Task Force Smith, were badly defeated in the Battle of Osan on July 5, the first encounter between US and KPA forces. For the first month after this defeat, the 24th Infantry was repeatedly defeated and forced south by superior KPA numbers and equipment. The regiments of the 24th Infantry were systematically pushed south in engagements around Chochiwon, Chonan, and Pyongtaek. The 24th made a final stand in the Battle of Taejon, where it was almost completely destroyed but delayed KPA forces until July 20. By that time, the Eighth Army's force of combat troops was roughly equal to KPA forces attacking the region, with new UN units arriving every day.

With Taejon captured, KPA forces began surrounding the Pusan Perimeter in an attempt to envelop it. They advanced on UN positions with armor and superior numbers, repeatedly defeating UN forces and forcing them further south.

=== Pusan Perimeter at Taegu ===
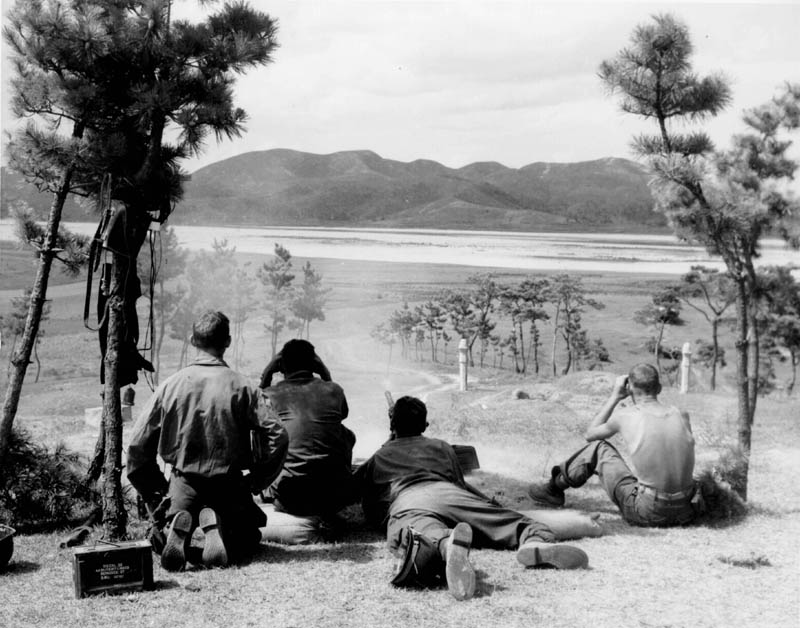
U.S. 1st Cavalry Division soldiers fire at North Korean troops crossing the Nakdong River during the Battle of Taegu.

In the meantime, Eighth Army commander General Walton Walker had established Taegu as the Eighth Army's headquarters. Right at the center of the Pusan Perimeter, Taegu stood at the entrance to the Nakdong River valley, an area where large numbers of KPA forces could advance while supporting one another. The natural barriers provided by the Nakdong River to the south and the mountainous terrain to the north converged around Taegu, which was also the major transportation hub and last major South Korean city aside from Pusan itself to remain in UN hands. From south to north, the city was defended by the US 1st Cavalry Division and the ROK 1st and 6th Infantry Divisions of ROK II Corps. 1st Cavalry Division, under the command of Maj. Gen. Hobart R. Gay, was spread out in a line along the Nakdong River to the south, with its 5th and 8th Cavalry Regiments holding a 24-kilometer (15 mi) line along the river and the 7th Cavalry Regiment in reserve along with artillery forces, ready to reinforce anywhere a crossing could be attempted.

Five KPA divisions massed to oppose the UN at Taegu; from south to north, the 10th, 3rd, 15th, 13th, and 1st Divisions occupied a line from Tuksong-dong and around Waegwan to Kunwi. The KPA planned to use the natural corridor of the Nakdong valley from Sangju to Taegu as its main axis of attack for the next push south. Elements of the KPA 105th Armored Division were also supporting the attack.

Beginning August 5, these divisions initiated numerous crossing attempts to assault the UN forces on the other side of the river in an attempt to capture Taegu and collapse the final UN defensive line. The US forces were successful in repelling KPA advances thanks to training and support, but forces in the ROK sectors were not as successful. During this time, isolated reports and rumors of war crimes committed by both sides began to surface.

=== Military geography ===
Hill 303 forms an elongated oval 2 miles (3.2 km) long on a northeast–southwest axis with a peak elevation of 994 feet (303 m). It is the first hill mass north of Waegwan and its southern slope comes down to the edge of the town. The hill grants observation of Waegwan, a network of roads running out of the town, the railroad and highway bridges across the river at that point, and long stretches of the river valley to the north and to the south. Its western slope terminates at the east bank of the Nakdong River. From Waegwan a road runs north and south along the east bank of the Nakdong, another northeast through the mountains toward Tabu-dong, and still another southeast toward Taegu. Hill 303 was a critical terrain feature in control of the main Pusan-Seoul railroad and highway crossing of the Nakdong, as well as of Waegwan itself.

== Massacre ==
The exact details of the massacre are unknown. The outline is based on the accounts of four US soldiers who survived the event. Three captured KPA soldiers were pointed out by the survivors as participants in the killings, and these three also gave conflicting accounts of what happened.

=== North Korean advance ===
The northernmost unit of the 1st Cavalry Division's sector was G Company of the 5th Cavalry Regiment. It held Hill 303, the furthest position on the Eighth Army's extreme right flank. To the north lay the ROK 1st Division.

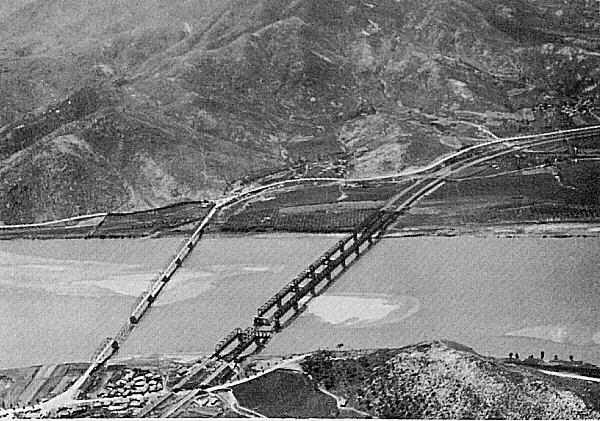
The Waegwan Bridge (collapsed) crossing of the Nakdong River. Hill 303 is visible on the bottom right

For several days, UN intelligence sources had reported heavy KPA concentrations across the Nakdong, opposite the ROK 1st Division. Early in the morning on August 14, a KPA regiment crossed the Nakdong 6 miles (9.7 km) north of Waegwan into the ROK 1st Division sector through an underwater bridge. Shortly after midnight ROK forces on the high ground just north of the US-ROK Army boundary were attacked by this force. After daylight an air strike partially destroyed the underwater bridge. The KPA attack spread south and, by 12:00 (KST), KPA small-arms fire fell on G Company, 5th Cavalry Regiment, on Hill 303. Instead of moving east into the mountains as other landings had, this force turned south and headed for Waegwan.

At 03:30 in the morning on August 15, G Company troops on Hill 303 spotted 50 KPA infantry supported by two T-34 tanks moving south along the river road at the base of the hill. They also spotted another column moving to their rear, which quickly engaged F Company with small-arms fire. In order to escape the enemy encirclement, F Company withdrew south, but G Company did not. By 08:30 the KPA had completely surrounded it and a supporting platoon of H Company mortarmen on Hill 303. At this point the force on the hill was cut off from the rest of the US force. A relief column, composed of B Company, 5th Cavalry, and a platoon of US tanks, tried to reach G Company but was unable to penetrate the KPA force that was surrounding Hill 303.

=== US forces captured ===
According to survivor accounts, before dawn on August 15, the H Company mortar platoon became aware of enemy activity near Hill 303. The platoon leader telephoned G Company, 5th Cavalry, which informed him a platoon of 60 ROK troops would come to reinforce the mortar platoon. Later in the morning, the platoon saw two KPA T-34s followed by 200 or more enemy soldiers on the road below them. A little later, a group of Koreans appeared on the slope. A patrol going to meet the climbing Korean troops called out and received in reply a blast of gunfire from automatic weapons. The mortar platoon leader, Lieutenant Jack Hudspeth, believed they were friendly. Some of the Americans realized that the advancing troops were KPA and were going to fire upon them, according to Privates Fred Ryan and Roy Manring, who gave their accounts when they revisited the old mortar position in 1999. Hudspeth ordered them not to fire and threatened them with a court-martial if they did. The rest of the watching Americans were not convinced that the new arrivals were enemy soldiers until the red stars became visible on their field caps. By that time, they were extremely close to the US positions. The KPA troops came right up to the foxholes without either side firing a shot. Hudspeth ordered his platoon to surrender without a fight as it was far outnumbered and outgunned. The KPA quickly took the mortarmen captive. Estimates of the number captured range from 31 to 42.

They were captured by the 4th Company, 2nd Battalion, 206th Mechanized Infantry Regiment, 105th Armored Division. The KPA troops marched their prisoners down the hill after taking their weapons and valuables. In a nearby orchard, they tied the prisoners' hands behind their backs, took some of their clothing and removed their shoes. They told them they would be sent to the prisoner-of-war camp in Seoul if they behaved well.

=== Imprisonment ===
The original captors did not stay in continuous possession of the prisoners throughout the next two days. There is some evidence that elements of the KPA 3rd Division guarded them after capture. During the first night of captivity, the KPA gave the American prisoners water, fruit and cigarettes. Survivors claimed this was the only food and water the KPA gave them over the three days of their imprisonment. The Americans dug holes in the sand to get more water to drink. The KPA intended to move them across the Nakdong River that night, but US artillery fire on the river crossing sites prevented safe movement. During the night, two of the Americans loosened their bindings, causing a brief commotion. KPA soldiers threatened to shoot the Americans but, according to one survivor's account, a KPA officer shot one of his own men for threatening this. Two captured American officers—Lieutenant Hudspeth, the platoon leader of the mortar platoon, and Lieutenant Cecil Newman, who was a forward artillery observer, were seen conferring with each other about an escape plan according to Private Fred Ryan. Both escaped during the night, but were captured and executed. The KPA attempted to keep the Americans hidden during the day and move them at night, but attacks by US forces made this difficult.

The next day, August 16, the prisoners were moved with their guards. One of the mortarmen, Corporal Roy L. Day Jr., spoke Japanese and was able to converse with some of the North Koreans. That afternoon, he overheard a KPA lieutenant say they would kill the prisoners if US forces advanced too close. Later that day, other US forces began to assault Hill 303 to retake the position. B Company and several US tanks tried a second time to retake the hill, now estimated to contain a 700-man battalion. The 61st Field Artillery Battalion and elements of the 82nd Field Artillery Battalion fired on the hill during the day. That night, G Company succeeded in escaping from Hill 303. Guards took away five of the American prisoners; the others did not know what became of them.

Before dawn on August 17, troops from both the 1st and 2nd Battalions, 5th Cavalry Regiment, supported by A Company of the 70th Tank Battalion, attacked Hill 303, but heavy KPA mortar fire stopped them at the edge of Waegwan. During the morning, US artillery heavily bombarded the KPA positions on the hill. Throughout the morning of August 17, the KPA guards exchanged fire with US troops attempting to rescue the prisoners. Around 12:00, the KPA unit holding the Americans placed them in a gully on the hill with a light company of 50 guards. Several more American prisoners were added to the group during the day, bringing the number of prisoners on Hill 303 to 45. One survivor estimated that the total number of prisoners was 67 and that the balance of the prisoners were executed on August 15 or 16.

=== Execution ===
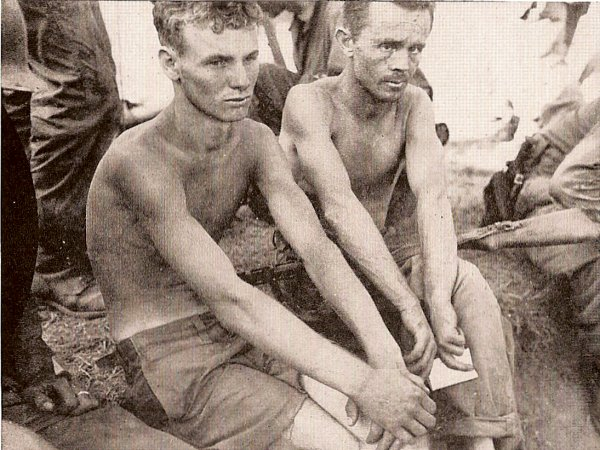
Hill 303 survivors 17 August 1950

At 14:00 on August 17, a UN air strike took place, attacking the hill with napalm, bombs, rockets and machine guns. At this time, a KPA officer said that US soldiers were closing in on them and they could not continue to hold the prisoners. The officer ordered the men executed, and the KPA then fired into the Americans in the gully. One of the KPA who was later captured said all or most of the 50 guards participated, but some of the survivors said only a group of 14 KPA guards, directed by their non-commissioned officers, fired into them with PPSh-41 "burp guns". Before all the KPA soldiers left the area, some returned to the ravine and shot survivors of the initial massacre. Only four or five of the men in this group survived, by hiding under the dead bodies of others. In all, 41 US prisoners were killed in the ravine, of which 26 were from the mortar platoon.

The US air strike and artillery bombardment pushed the KPA forces off the hill. After the strike, at 15:30, the infantry attacked up the hill unopposed and secured it by 16:30. The combined strength of E and F Companies on the hill was about 60 men. The artillery and the air strike killed and wounded an estimated 500 KPA troops on Hill 303, with survivors fleeing in complete disorder. Two of the massacre survivors making their way down the hill to meet the counter-attacking force were fired upon before they could establish their identity, but not hit. The 5th Cavalry Regiment quickly discovered the bodies of the prisoners with machine-gun wounds, hands still bound behind their backs.

That night, near Waegwan, KPA anti-tank fire hit and knocked out two tanks of the 70th Armor Regiment. The next day, August 18, US troops found the bodies of six members of the tank crews showing indications that they had been captured and executed in the same manner as the men on Hill 303.

== Aftermath ==
=== US response ===
The incident on Hill 303 led UN commander General Douglas MacArthur to broadcast to the KPA on August 20, denouncing the atrocities. The U.S. Air Force dropped many leaflets over enemy territory, addressed to North Korean commanders. MacArthur warned that he would hold North Korea's senior military leaders responsible for the event and any other war crimes.

Inertia on your part and on the part of your senior field commanders in the discharge of this grave and universally recognized command responsibility may only be construed as a condonation and encouragement of such outrage, for which, if not promptly corrected, I shall hold you and your commanders criminally accountable under the rules and precedents of war.

— General of the Army Douglas MacArthur's closing remark in his broadcast to the North Korean Army on the incident.

The incident at Hill 303 would be only one in a series of atrocities committed by KPA soldiers. In late 1953, the United States Senate Committee on Government Operations, led by Joseph McCarthy, conducted an investigation of up to 1,800 reported incidents of war crimes allegedly committed throughout the Korean War. The Hill 303 massacre was one of the first to be investigated. Survivors of the incident were called to testify before the committee, and the US government concluded that the KPA violated the terms of the Geneva Convention, and condemned its actions.

=== North Korean response ===
Historians agree there is no evidence that the KPA High Command sanctioned the shooting of prisoners during the early phase of the war. The Hill 303 massacre and similar atrocities are believed to have been conducted by "uncontrolled small units, by vindictive individuals, or because of unfavorable and increasingly desperate situations confronting the captors." T. R. Fehrenbach, a military historian, wrote in his analysis of the event that KPA troops committing these events were likely accustomed to torture and execution of prisoners due to decades of rule by oppressive armies of the Empire of Japan up through World War II.

On July 28, 1950, General Lee Yong Ho, commander of the KPA 3rd Division, had transmitted an order pertaining to the treatment of prisoners of war, signed by Choi Yong-kun, Commander-in-Chief, and Kim Chaek, Commander of the KPA Advanced General Headquarters, which stated killing prisoners of war was "strictly prohibited". He directed individual units' Cultural Sections to inform the division's troops of the rule.

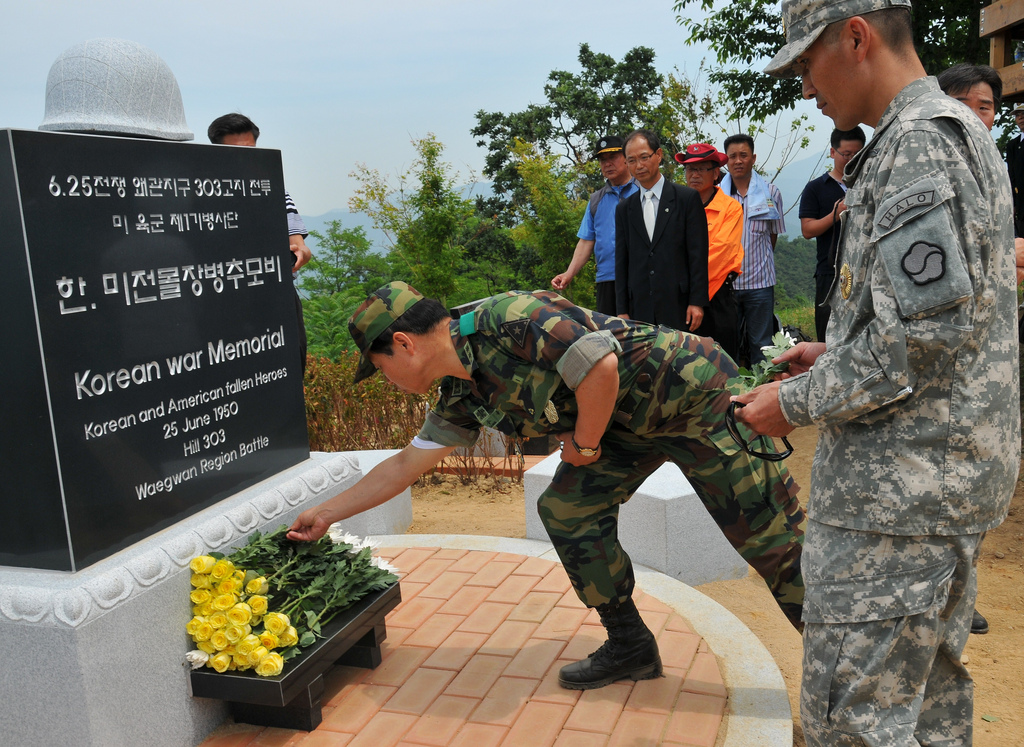
U.S. and ROK soldiers lay roses at the foot of the memorial established on Hill 303.

Documents captured after the event showed that KPA leaders were aware of—and concerned about—the conduct of some of their soldiers. An order issued by the Cultural Section of the KPA 2nd Division dated August 16 said, in part, "Some of us are still slaughtering enemy troops that come to surrender. Therefore, the responsibility of teaching the soldiers to take prisoners of war and to treat them kindly rests on the Political Section of each unit."

=== Monument ===
The story quickly gained media attention in the United States, and the survivors' accounts received a great deal of coverage including prominent magazines such as Time and Life. In the years following the Korean War, the US Army established a permanent garrison in Waegwan, Camp Carroll, which is located near the base of Hill 303.

The incident was largely forgotten until Second Lieutenant David Kangas read about the incident in the Korean War history book South to the Nakdong, North to the Yalu by United States Army Center of Military History while stationed at Camp Carroll in 1985, and after checking with various US Army and local sources, he realized that the location of the massacre was unknown. He obtained battle records through the National Archives to pinpoint the location and then began to search for the remaining survivors. The original memorial for the POWs was emplaced in 1990 in front of the garrison headquarters, although none of the American survivors were located by Kangas until 1991. In 1999, Fred Ryan and Roy Manring, two of the three surviving POWs, were invited to attend a ceremony at the execution site. Both Ryan and Manring as well as James Rudd, the third surviving POW, had long been denied VA compensation claims for their severe injuries incurred during the execution because they had never been officially designated as prisoners of war by the US Army. Later, the base garrison at Camp Carroll raised funds to construct a much larger memorial at the massacre site on Hill 303. South Korean military and civilians around Waegwan contributed to the funds for this memorial.

The original memorial was placed on the hill on August 17, 2003. In 2009, soldiers of the US 501st Sustainment Brigade began to gather funds for a second, larger monument on the hill. With the assistance of South Korean veterans, politicians and local citizens, the second monument was flown to the top of the hill by a US CH-47 Chinook helicopter on May 26, 2010, in preparation for the 60th anniversary of the event. An annual memorial service is held on the hill to commemorate the deaths of the troops on Hill 303. Troops garrisoned at Camp Carroll scale the hill and place flowers at the monument as a part of this service.

== See also ==
- List of massacres in South Korea
- Bodo League massacre
- Chaplain–Medic massacre
- No Gun Ri massacre
- Seoul National University Hospital massacre
- Sunchon tunnel massacre
- Remembered Prisoners of a Forgotten War: An Oral History of Korean War POWs
