= Sunchon tunnel massacre =

Mass killings of US POWs by North Korean soldiers

- Part of the Korean War
- Location: Sunchon, South Pyongan, North Korea
- Date: October 30, 1950
- Deaths: 68
- Injuries: 21 (2 died after rescue)
- Victim: American prisoners of war
- Perpetrator: Korean People's Army

The Sunchon tunnel massacre was a death march and massacre of American prisoners of war by the Korean People's Army (KPA) in Sunchon, North Korea during the Korean War on October 30, 1950. A group of around 180 Americans POWs captured in the UN offensive into North Korea who had survived the Tiger Death March from Seoul to Pyongyang were loaded onto railcars by the KPA and transported deep into North Korea. Some of the POWs died during the four-to-five day journey to Sunchon, being unprotected from the harsh climate and given no food, water, or medical treatment. Survivors were unloaded at a tunnel in Sunchon, being told by the North Koreans they would be given food and treatment. Instead, they were divided into groups of 40, marched to a nearby ravine, and then shot en masse with submachine guns by the KPA.

A witness said the prisoners "went around the corner, into this ditch. They [the KPA] said, “Get down; the planes. Get down; the planes. So when we all ducked down some more of them came up on us over a little rice paddy and they just opened up." 68 people were killed out of 138 people who died during the journey. By the time they had been rescued by a joint South Korean-American rescue mission, there were only 21 survivors, whom a South Korean detachment safely conveyed along with the dead to Pyongyang, where C-54 Skymasters flew them to Japan. Fatalities were listed at 68 killed, though two of the survivors died of their wounds following their rescue.

The Sunchon massacre was documented by Charles E. Potter in the Subcommittee on Korean War Atrocities.

In 2024 the remains of United States Army Sergeant Raymond Hall who was among those killed in the massacre were identified.

== See also ==
- Bloody Gulch massacre
- List of massacres in North Korea
