= List of massacres in North Korea =

The following is a list of massacres that have occurred in North Korea (numbers may be approximate): (Note: Note that while large democides have been reported to have occurred in North Korea, individual massacres are rarely named and identified separately.)

Name	Date	Location	Deaths	Perpetrator	Notes
Sinchon Massacre	Fall 1950, over a 52-day period	near Sinchon	35,380 (North Korean claim)	South Korea, United States (North Korean claim); North Korea (South Korean claim)	North Korea claims that the U.S. engaged in a large massacre that occurred over a 52 day period in Sinchon, North Korea.
Sunchon tunnel massacre	October 1950	Pyongyang	68	North Korea	
Onsong concentration camp riot massacre	May 1987	Changpyong, Onsong County, North Hamgyong	One-third or all of the ~200 or ~5,000 rioters	North Korea	

== See also ==
- Mass killings in North Korea
- List of massacres in South Korea
