= Geumnam-myeon, Sejong =

Township of Sejong City, South Korea

- Hangul: 금남면
- Hanja: 錦南面
- RR: Geumnam-myeon
- MR: Kŭmnam-myŏn

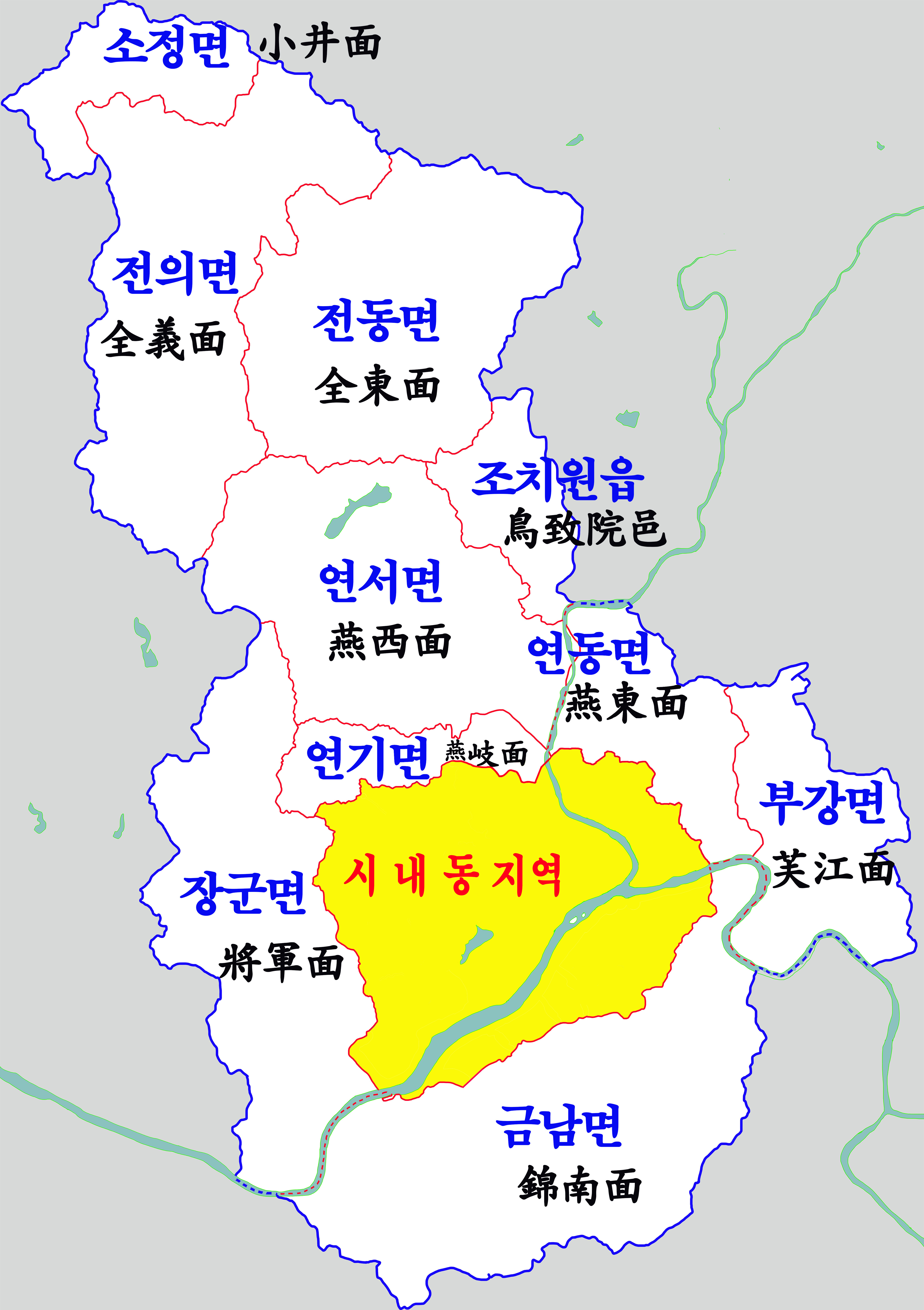
Map of Sejong City

Geumnam-myeon (Korean: 금남면) is a township of Sejong City, South Korea.
