= Bloody Gulch massacre =

War crime during the Korean War

- Location: Masan (Changwon), South Korea
- Date: August 12, 1950; 76 years ago (KST)
- Target: US Army prisoners of war
- Attack type: Mass murder, summary execution, war crime
- Deaths: 75
- Perpetrator: North Korean army soldiers

The Bloody Gulch massacre was a war crime that took place in the Korean War on August 12, 1950, in "Bloody Gulch", west of Masan, South Korea. After a successful attack on two US artillery battalions that killed or injured hundreds of US soldiers, North Korea's Korean People's Army (KPA) 13th Regiment then killed 75 US Army prisoners of war. Otherwise this was one of the smaller engagements of the Battle of Pusan Perimeter. The 75 soldiers were from the 555th Field Artillery Battalion of the US 24th Infantry Division and the 90th Field Artillery Battalion of the US 25th Infantry Division.

== Background ==
=== The Korean War begins ===
Following the invasion of South Korea by North Korea on June 25, 1950, the United Nations voted to use force to defend South Korea. The United States subsequently committed ground forces to the Korean peninsula with the goal of fighting back the North Korean invasion and to prevent South Korea from collapsing.

The 24th Infantry Division was the first US unit sent into Korea. The unit was to take the initial "shock" of KPA advances, delaying much larger KPA units to buy time to allow reinforcements to arrive. The division was consequently alone for several weeks as it attempted to delay the KPA, making time for the 1st Cavalry and the 7th and 25th Infantry Divisions, along with other Eighth United States Army supporting units, to move into position. Advance elements of the 24th Infantry, known as Task Force Smith, were badly defeated in the Battle of Osan on July 5, the first encounter between US and KPA forces. For the first month after this defeat, the 24th Infantry was repeatedly defeated and forced south by superior KPA numbers and equipment. The regiments of the 24th Division were systematically pushed south in engagements around Chochiwon, Chonan, and Pyongtaek. The 24th made a final stand in the Battle of Taejon, where it was almost completely destroyed but delayed KPA forces until July 20. By that time, the Eighth Army's force of combat troops were roughly equal to KPA forces attacking the region, with new UN units arriving every day.

With Taejon captured, KPA forces began surrounding the Pusan Perimeter in an attempt to envelop it. They advanced on United Nations Command (UN) positions with armor and superior numbers, repeatedly defeating US and Republic of Korea Army (ROKA) forces and forcing them further south.

=== Pusan Perimeter at Masan ===
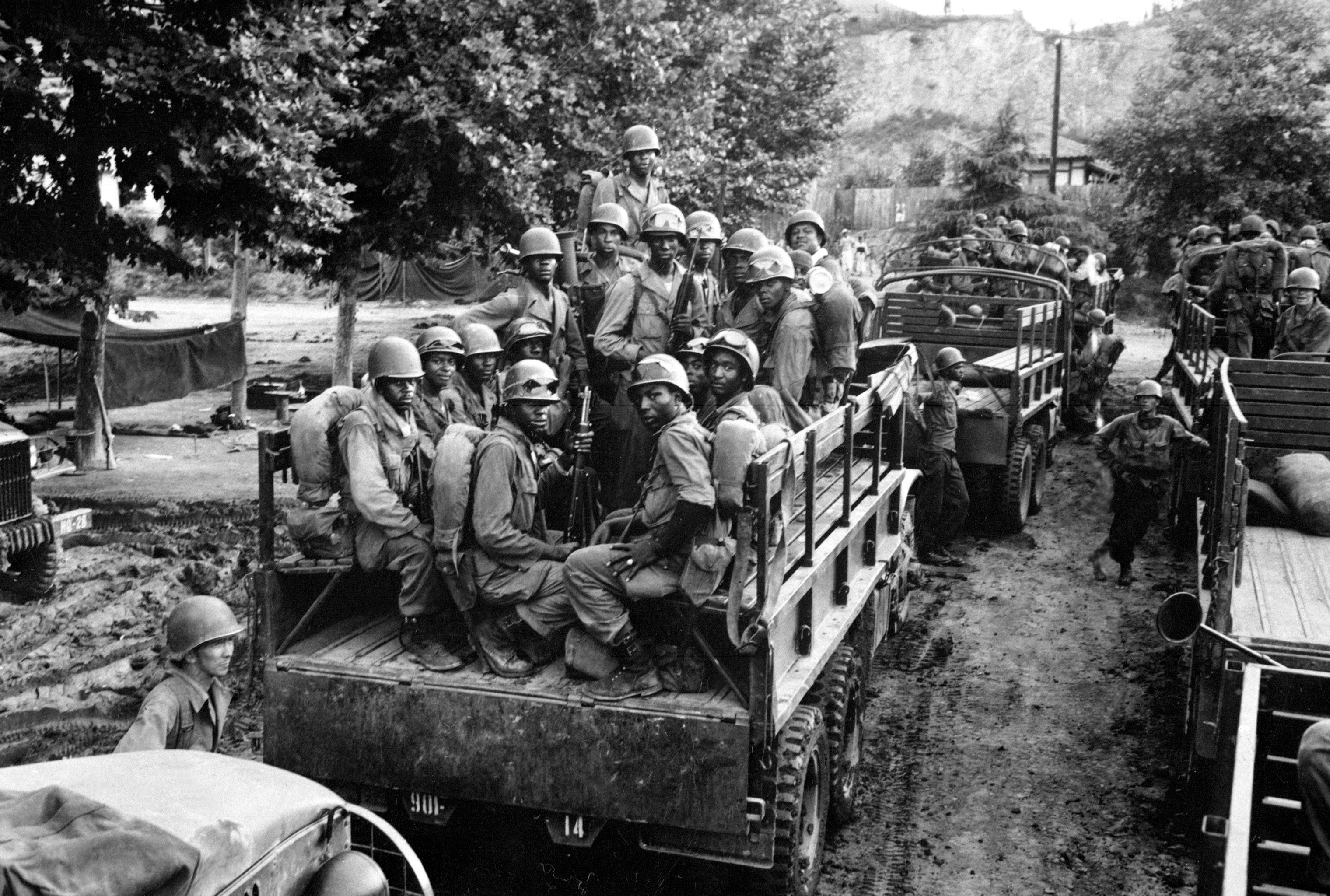
Soldiers of the US 24th Infantry Regiment move to the Masan battleground

Lieutenant General Walton Walker and the Eighth Army began preparing a counteroffensive, the first conducted by the UN in the war, for August. It would commence with an attack by the US reserve units on the Masan area to secure Chinju from the KPA 6th Division, followed by a larger general push to the Kum River in the middle of the month. One of his goals was to break up a suspected massing of KPA troops near the Taegu area by forcing the diversion of some KPA units southward. On August 6, the Eighth Army issued the operational directive for the attack by Task Force Kean, named for the US 25th Infantry Division commander, Major General William B. Kean. Task Force Kean consisted of the 25th Division, less the 27th Infantry and a field artillery battalion, with the 5th Regimental Combat Team and the 1st Provisional Marine Brigade attached, a force of about 20,000 men. The plan of attack required the force to move west from positions held near Masan, seize the Chinju Pass, and secure the line as far as the Nam River. However, the offensive relied on the arrival of the entire 2nd Infantry Division, as well as three more battalions of US tanks.

Task Force Kean kicked off its attack on August 7, moving out from Masan. At the Notch, a northern pass into the city and site of a previous battle, the 35th Infantry Regiment encountered 500 KPA Infantry, defeating them. The Task Force surged forward to Pansong, inflicting another 350 casualties on the KPA. There, they overran the KPA 6th Division's headquarters. However the rest of the Task Force was slowed by enemy resistance. Task Force Kean pressed on the Chindong-ni area, resulting in a confused battle where the fragmented force had to rely on air strikes and airdrops to keep it effective. Task Force Kean's offensive had collided with one being delivered simultaneously by the KPA 6th Division.

Heavy fighting continued in the area for three days. By August 9, Task Force Kean was poised to retake Chinju. The task force, aided by air power, initially advanced quickly though KPA resistance was heavy. On August 10 the Marines picked up the advance, inadvertently discovering the KPA 83rd Motorized Regiment of the 105th Armored Division. F4U Corsairs from the 1st Marine Air Wing strafed the retreating column repeatedly, inflicting 200 casualties and destroying about 100 of the regiment's equipment vehicles. However the 1st Provisional Marine Brigade forces were withdrawn from the force on August 12 to be redeployed elsewhere on the perimeter. Task Force Kean continued forward supported by naval artillery and field artillery, capturing the area around Chondong-ni. However, Eighth Army requested several of its units to redeploy to Taegu to be used elsewhere on the front, particularly at the Naktong Bulge

== Massacre ==
=== Fight at Pongam-ni ===
As the Marine brigade maneuvered around the southern coastal loop toward Chinju, the 5th Regimental Combat Team planned a simultaneous attack in the center of the line toward Much'on-ni, its planned junction point with the 35th Infantry. On August 10, as the 5th Infantry moved toward Pongam-ni (35.13°N 128.375°E), aerial observation did not find KPA troop concentrations ahead of it. US Navy aircraft, however, did spot and attack KPA north of Pongam-ni and Tundok to the north. The 1st Battalion attacked down the north side of the road and the 2d Battalion down the south side. The 1st Battalion on its side encountered the KPA on the hills near Pongam-ni, but was able to enter the town and establish its command post there.

The village of Pongam was a village of mud-walled and thatch-roofed huts clustered around a road junction. It and Taejong-ni were small villages 200 yards (180 m) apart on the east side of the pass. About 400 yards (370 m) northeast of Pongam-ni rose a steep, barren hill, which was the end of a long ridge that paralleled road about 800 yards (730 m) from its north side. The KPA occupied this ridge. Northward from Pongam-ni extended a valley 500 yards (460 m) wide. The main road ran westward along its base and climbed out of the valley at a pass where this ridge joined the other slanting in from the north. Immediately west of Pongam-ni the two ridges were separated by a valley 300 yards (270 m) wide. The northern ridge was the higher.

On August 10, the 2nd Battalion, 5th Regimental Combat Team, held the southern of these two ridges at Pongam-ni and B and C Companies of the 1st Battalion held the eastern part of the northern one. The KPA held the remainder of this ridge and contested control of the pass. During the day the regiment's support artillery came up and went into positions in the stream bed and low ground at Pongam-ni and Taejong-ni. A Battery of the 555th Field Artillery Battalion emplaced under the concrete bridge at Pongam-ni, and B Battery went into position along the stream bank at the edge of the village. Headquarters Battery established itself in the village. The 90th Field Artillery Battalion, less one battery, had emplaced on the west side of the south-flowing stream. All the artillery pieces were on the north side of the east–west road. The 5th Regimental Combat Team headquarters and C Battery of the 555th Field Artillery Battalion were eastward in a rear position.

That night, KPA attacked the 1st Battalion and the artillery positions at Pongam-ni. The action continued after daylight. During this fight, Lieutenant Colonel John H. Daly, the 555th Field Artillery Battalion commander, lost communication with his A Battery. With the help of some infantry, he and the 1st Battalion commander, tried to reach the battery but both were wounded in the process. Daly then assumed temporary command of the infantry battalion as he was less seriously injured. As the day progressed, the KPA attacks at Pongam-ni lost speed and momentum and finally came to a halt.

When the 3rd Battalion attacked westward, the 5th Regimental Combat Team headquarters and C Battery of the 555th Field Artillery Battalion, east of Pongam-ni, had been left without protecting infantry close at hand. KPA attacked them during the night at the same time Pongam-ni came under attack, though Regimental Headquarters and C Battery were able to force back the attack. On the morning of the 11th, close-in air strikes helped drive the KPA back into the hills. The 2nd Battalion headquarters had also come under attack and was repulsed with the assistance of reserve troops.

The plan for passing the regiment westward through Pongam-ni was for the 2nd Battalion to withdraw from the south ridge and start the movement, after the 1st Battalion had secured the north ridge and the pass. The regimental trains were to follow and next the artillery. The 1st Battalion was then to disengage and cover the rear of the formation. The 1st Battalion was ordered to clear the ridge north of the road west of Pongam-ni, secure the pass, protect the combat team as it moved west through the pass, and then follow it. Just before dark, B Company moved to the head of the gulch and attacked the hill on the right overlooking the north side of the pass. At the same time, C Company attacked west along the north ridge. The artillery and all available weapons of the 2nd Battalion supported the attack, and before dusk B Company had gained and occupied the commanding ground north of the pass. One platoon of A Company, reinforced with a section of tanks, remained in its position north of Pongam-ni on the Tundok road, to protect from that direction the road junction village and the artillery positions. The remainder of A Company relieved the 2nd Battalion on the south ridge, when it withdrew from there at 21:00 to lead the movement westward.

=== Movement ===
As a result of heavy fighting during the night of August 10–11 and during the day of the 11th, the regimental commander decided that he could not safely move the regimental trains and the artillery through the pass during the day, and accordingly he had made plans to do it that night. That afternoon, however, Kean wanted the division to move forward rapidly, and said that a battalion of the 24th Infantry Regiment would come up and protect its right, north flank. Kean apparently did not believe any considerable force of enemy troops was in the vicinity of Pongam-ni, despite representations to the contrary.

About 21:00, as 2nd Battalion, C Battery of the 555th, and the trains were forming on the road, Kean ordered the commanders to move the 2nd Battalion and one battery of artillery through the pass immediately, but to hold the rest of the troops in place until daylight. Immediately, the 2nd Battalion moved through the pass, and once over it was out of communication with the rest of the regiment. In effect, though the 2nd Battalion thought it was the advance guard of the rest of the regiment, it was on its own and neither force could assist the other if it came under attack. In the movement of the 2nd Battalion and C and Headquarters Batteries, Daly was wounded a second time and was evacuated. The 2nd Battalion cleared the pass before midnight. On the west side it came under light attack, but was able to continue its advance all the way to Taejong-ni, where it held position for the rest of the night.

While these events were taking place at Pongam-ni during daylight and the evening of August 11, the main supply road back toward Chindong-ni was under sniper fire probing attacks. Three US tanks and an assault gun escorted supply convoys to the forward positions. By midnight of August 11, the 555th Field Artillery Battalion, firing 105 mm howitzers, along with and Headquarters and A Batteries, of the 90th Field Artillery Battalion emplaced at Pongam-ni and Taejong-ni-had near them only the 1st Battalion north of the road. The regimental headquarters and the guns of the 159th Field Artillery Battalion were emplaced 1 mile (1.6 km) behind them along the road.

Sometime after 01:00, 12 August, 2nd Battalion lost contact with C Company on the ridge northward and sounds of combat could be heard coming from that area. When further efforts to reach the company by telephone and radio failed, the battalion commander sent runners and a wire crew out to try to re-establish contact. He then urged speedy movement of the trains and artillery westward through the pass. But the regimental commander reluctantly held firm to division orders not to move until after daylight. The runners returned and said they could not find the company. The wire crew was missing. Members of the battalion staff had again heard sounds of combat in the company area. They also had seen flares there. This was interpreted to mean that KPA troops held it and were signaling to allied units. Still unable to contact the division, 5th Infantry now decided to move the trains and artillery out westward while it was still dark, despite division orders to wait for daylight, seeing too much risk in delaying any longer. The battalion of the 24th Infantry promised by the division had not arrived. About 04:00 the trains moved out. They were to be followed by the artillery, and then the 1st Battalion would bring up the rear. In the meantime, the battalion was to hold open the pass and protect the regimental column. Movement of the trains through the pass should have been accomplished in twenty minutes, but it required hours. During the hour or more before daylight, no vehicle moved more than 10–20 feet (3.0–6.1 m) at a time. One of the factors creating this situation was caused when the Medical Company tried to move into the column from its position near the 1st Battalion command post. An ambulance hung up in a ditch and stopped everything on the road behind it until it could be pulled out.

=== Artillery surrounded ===
About this time, soon after daybreak, KPA infantry had closed in so as to virtually surround the artillery, still in the village. The KPA 13th Regiment, 6th Division now struck furiously from three sides at the 555th and 90th Field Artillery Battalions' positions. The attack came suddenly and with devastating power. Troops in the column spotted two tanks and several self-propelled guns on the dirt trail in the valley north of Pongam-ni, firing into the village and the artillery positions.

The withdrawal of the section of tanks and the A Company infantry platoon from its roadblock position had permitted this KPA armor force to approach undetected and unopposed, almost to point-blank range, and with completely disastrous effects. The 555th emplacements were in the open and exposed to this fire; those of the 90th were partially protected by terrain features. The howitzers of the 555th Field Artillery Battalion ineffectually engaged the KPA armor. The 90th could not depress its howitzers low enough to engage the tanks and the self-propelled guns. Some of the 555th guns received direct hits. Many of the artillerymen of this battalion sought cover in buildings and under the bridge at Taejong-ni. Some of the buildings caught fire.

Soon after the KPA armor came down the trail from the north and shot up the artillery positions, KPA infantry closed on the 555th Artillery emplacements and fired on the men with small arms and automatic weapons. Three of the 105 mm howitzers managed to continue firing for several hours after daybreak, perhaps until 09:00. Then the KPA overran the 555th positions. The 90th Field Artillery Battalion suffered almost as great a calamity. Early in the pre-dawn attack, the KPA scored direct hits on two 155 mm howitzers and several ammunition trucks of A Battery. Only by fighting resolutely as infantrymen, manning the machine guns on the perimeter and occupying foxholes as riflemen, were the battalion troops able to repel the KPA attack.

At daybreak, F4U Corsairs flew in to strafe and rocket the KPA concentrations. Despite this close air support, the artillery position was untenable by 09:00. Survivors of the 90th loaded the wounded on the few serviceable trucks. Then, with the uninjured giving covering fire and US Air Force (USAF) F-51 Mustang fighter planes strafing the KPA, the battalion withdrew on foot. Survivors credited the vicious close-in attacks of the fighter planes with making the withdrawal possible. KPA fire destroyed or burned nearly every vehicle east of the Pongam-ni bridge.

=== Massacre ===
At "Bloody Gulch", the name given by the troops to the scene of the successful enemy attack, the 555th Field Artillery on August 12 lost all eight of its howitzers in the two firing batteries there. The 90th Field Artillery Battalion lost all six 155 mm howitzers of its A Battery. The day after the attack, only 20 percent of the battalion troops were present for duty. The battalion estimated at the time that from 75 to 100 artillerymen were killed at the gun positions and 80 wounded, with many of the latter unable to get away. The 90th Field Artillery Battalion lost 10 men killed, 60 wounded, and about 30 missing at Bloody Gulch—more than half the men of Headquarters and A Batteries present.

With the swift attack, KPA troops had surrounded and virtually destroyed four artillery batteries in the village. In addition to the hundreds of American servicemen the KPA had killed and wounded in the attack, they were able to capture the last survivors of the devastated force: 55 men from the 555th Field Artillery Battalion, and 20 men from the 90th Field Artillery Battalion. In two separate events, all of these men were massacred. The men of the 555th Field Artillery were rounded up in nearby Taejong-ni. The KPA then ordered all of them into a house where they machine-gunned the entire group, killing all 55. In a separate location, the 20 survivors of the 90th Field Artillery Battalion were executed, each with a gunshot to the head. The bodies would not be recovered for five weeks until UN forces had regained the area after the breakout from the Pusan Perimeter.

== Aftermath ==
=== US response ===
The deaths at Bloody Gulch, combined with the subsequent Hill 303 massacre led UN commander General Douglas MacArthur to broadcast to the KPA on August 20, denouncing the atrocities. The USAF dropped many leaflets over enemy territory, addressed to KPA commanders. MacArthur warned that he would hold North Korea's senior military leaders responsible for the event, and any other war crimes.

Inertia on your part and on the part of your senior field commanders in the discharge of this grave and universally recognized command responsibility may only be construed as a condonation and encouragement of such outrage, for which if not promptly corrected I shall hold you and your commanders criminally accountable under the rules and precedents of war.

—General of the Army Douglas MacArthur's closing remark in his broadcast to the North Korean army on the incident.

The incident at Bloody Gulch would be only one of the first of a series of atrocities committed by KPA soldiers. In late 1953, the United States Senate Committee on Government Operations, led by Joseph McCarthy, conducted an investigation of up to 1,800 reported incidents of war crimes allegedly committed throughout the Korean War. The US government concluded that the KPA violated the terms of the Geneva Convention, and condemned its actions.

=== North Korean response ===
Historians agree there is no evidence that the KPA High Command sanctioned the shooting of prisoners during the early phase of the war. The Hill 303 massacre and similar atrocities are believed to have been conducted by "uncontrolled small units, by vindictive individuals, or because of unfavorable and increasingly desperate situations confronting the captors." T. R. Fehrenbach, a military historian, wrote in his analysis of the event that KPA troops committing these events were likely accustomed to torture and execution of prisoners due to decades of rule by oppressive armies of the Empire of Japan up until World War II.

On July 28, 1950, General Lee Yong Ho, commander of the KPA 3rd Division, had transmitted an order pertaining to the treatment of prisoners of war, signed by Kim Chaek, commander-in-chief, and Choi Yong-kun, commander of the KPA Advanced General Headquarters, which stated killing prisoners of war was "strictly prohibited". He directed individual units' cultural sections to inform the division's troops of the rule.

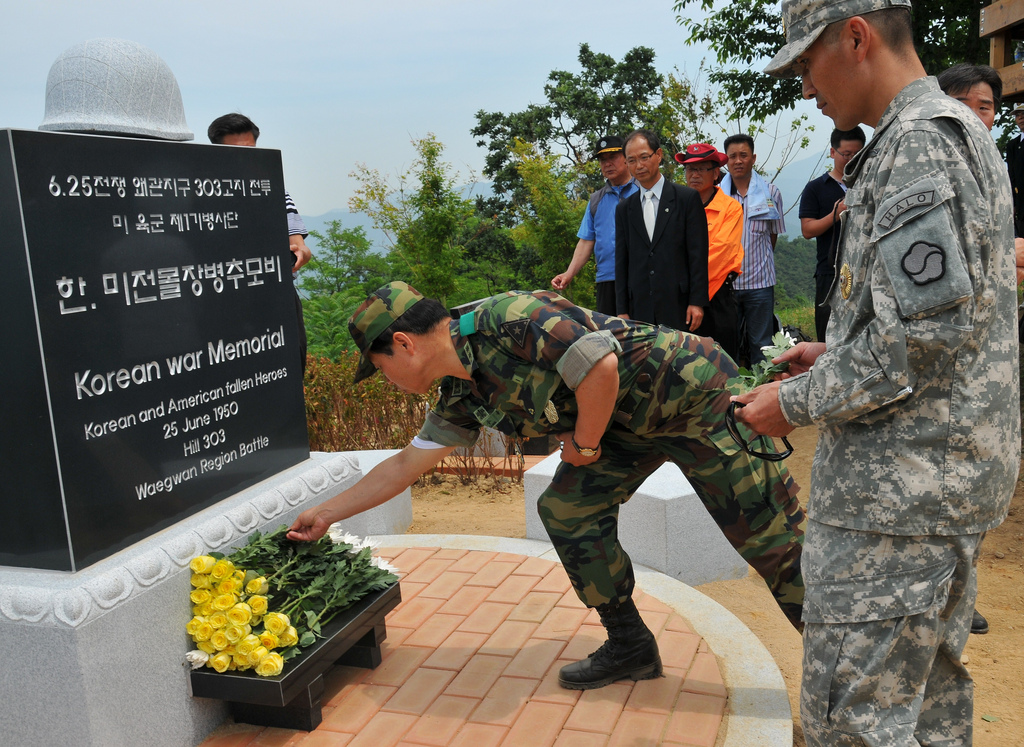
US and ROKA soldiers lay roses at the foot of the memorial established on Hill 303.

Documents captured after the event showed that KPA leaders were aware of—and concerned about—the conduct of some of its soldiers. An order issued by the Cultural Section of the KPA 2nd Division dated August 16 said, in part, "Some of us are still slaughtering enemy troops that come to surrender. Therefore, the responsibility of teaching the soldiers to take prisoners of war and to treat them kindly rests on the Political Section of each unit."

== See also ==
- Seoul National University Hospital Massacre
- Hill 303 massacre
