= Waegwan =

Town in North Gyeongsang, South Korea

Waegwan Korean: 왜관 Hanja: 倭館
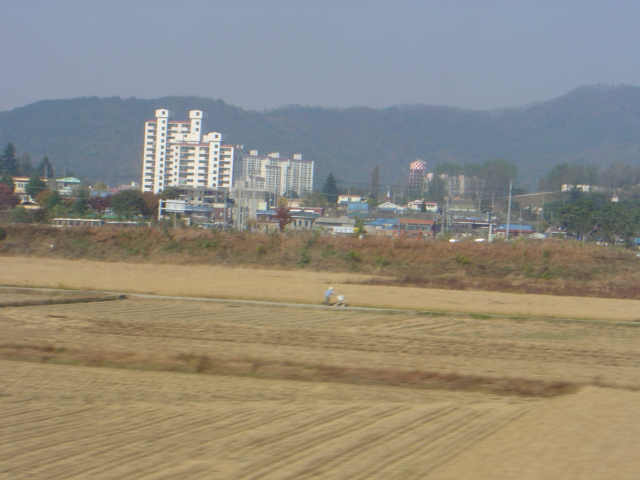
- View of Waegwan from the Gyeongbu Line railroad.

- Location within South Korea
- Coordinates: 35°58′58″N 128°24′10″E

Waegwan (Korean: 왜관) is the seat of government for Chilgok County, North Gyeongsang province, South Korea. It consists primarily of the administrative district of Waegwan-eup. It is situated on both sides of the Nakdong River, which is traversed by railroad, automobile and pedestrian bridges.

Waegwan is home to a Benedictine monastery and the United States Army base at Camp Carroll. It lies on the Gyeongbu Line of the Korean National Railroad, and is also connected to Daegu and other major cities via the Gyeongbu Expressway.

== History ==
Waegwan's name literally means "Japanese dwelling," and may indicate that the town was a common stopping-point for Japanese salt traders during the Joseon Dynasty.

In the summer of 1939, Korean and Japanese students from the Daegu Normal School (now the teachers' college of Kyungpook National University) were sent to Waegwan to do forced labor on the Gyeongbu Line railroad tracks. A demonstration, known as the Waegwan Incident (왜관사건) took place on July 26, in which Korean students protested preferential treatment given to Japanese students. In consequence, seven of the students were expelled.

=== Korean War ===
During the early phase of the Korean War in August and September 1950, the area around Waegwan was the site of intense fighting as North Korean forces pushed south toward Daegu. Monuments to the UN and South Korean forces now stand on the low mountain overlooking the northeastern section of the city, which is locally known as "Jagosan" and known in military reports as Hill 303.

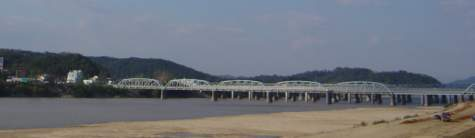
Bridges across the Nakdong River at Waegwan.

In an attempt to slow the Northern advance, on August 3 American forces blew up the bridge at Waegwan while hundreds of refugees were crossing. This took place under the orders of Major General Hobart R. Gay and Lieutenant General Dell Plunkett. They claimed that among the refugees were North Korean soldiers in disguise. In the 1990s, the halves of the bridge were reconnected to serve as a pedestrian crossing between the two halves of Waegwan.

This was not the only atrocity committed in the area. On August 27, 1950, the retreating North Korean forces who had gained control of the area shot more than forty American POWs on Hill 303. Of these, five survived.

== Notable landmarks ==
- Hill 303 memorial
- Waegwan Abbey

== See also ==
- List of cities in South Korea

== Notes ==
1. "Remarkable Germans in the Choson Kingdom" (PDF). Seoul: German Embassy in the Republic of Korea. Archived from the original (PDF) on 2011-07-18.
2. "대구사범학생독립운동 (Daegu Sabeom Haksaeng Dongnip Undong) (Independence movement of the Daegu normal students)". 독립운동관련용어 (Dongnip Undong Gwallyeon Yong-eo) (Terms related to the independence movement). Archived from the original on 2012-02-04.
3. "1950".
4. "Veterans: Other Incidents of Refugees Killed by GIs During Korea Retreat". Pulitzer Prize Winners website. Archived from the original on 2005-10-27.
5. The number of POWs involved is given variously as 42 by "Rediscovering Pvt. Ryan: Two US veterans recall forgotten massacre during the Korean War". Archived from the original on 2011-12-30. and 45 by "You are about to die a horrible death". VFW Magazine. Archived from the original on April 11, 2005.
