= Operation Dauntless =

Korean War UN Command offensive

- Part of the Korean War
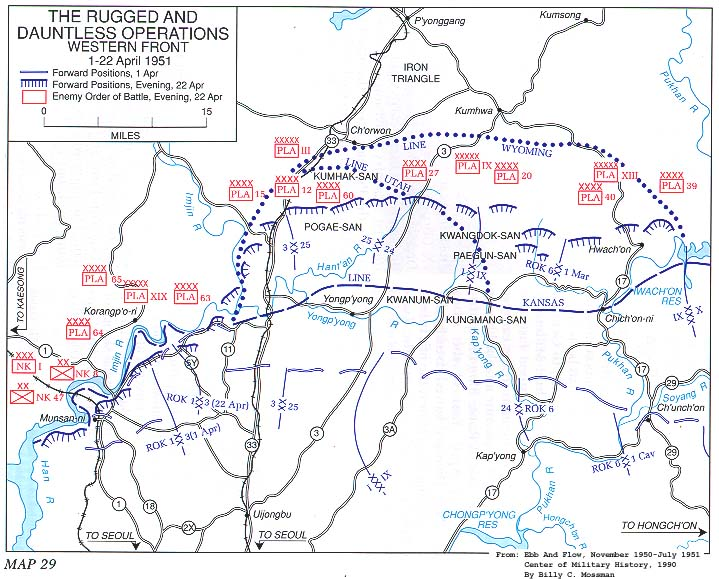
- Operations Rugged and Dauntless western front map
Date	9–22 April 1951
Location	Imjin River and Hwach'on Reservoir
Result	Initial U.N. success Chinese launch their Spring Offensive erasing all U.N. gains

Belligerents
United Nations: United States; South Korea; United Kingdom; Australia; Canada; New Zealand	China; North Korea

Commanders and leaders
Matthew Ridgway; James Van Fleet	Unknown

Operation Dauntless was a military operation performed by the United Nations Command (UN) during the Korean War designed to advance the UN lines to positions 10–20 miles (16–32 km) north of the 38th Parallel designated the Wyoming Line which would threaten the Chinese and North Korean logistics hub marked out by the towns of Pyonggang, Ch'orwon and Gimhwa-eup named the Iron Triangle. The operation immediately succeeded Operation Rugged which took the UN forces to the Kansas Line 2 to 6 miles (3.2 to 9.7 km) north of the 38th Parallel. The operation was initially successful, reaching its initial objectives, but was brought to a halt by the Chinese Spring Offensive on 22 April 1951.

== Background ==
On 22 March, following the successful conclusion of Operation Courageous, US Eighth Army commander Lieutenant general Matthew Ridgway notified UN forces commander General Douglas MacArthur that he was developing plans for an advance that would take Eighth Army forces 10 to 20 miles (16 to 32 km) above the 38th Parallel to a general line following the upstream trace of the Ryesong River as far as Sibyon-ni (38.309°N 126.695°E) in the west, falling off gently southeastward to the Hwach'on Reservoir, then running east to the coast. As in past and current operations, the objective would be the destruction of enemy troops and materiel. MacArthur approved Ridgway's concept but also scheduled a visit to Korea for 24 March, when he would have an opportunity to discuss the plans in more detail.

Upon his return to Tokyo late on 24 March, following his conference with Ridgway and a visit to the front, MacArthur announced that he had directed the Eighth Army to cross the 38th Parallel "if and when its security makes it tactically advisable. More specifically MacArthur had approved Ridgway's concept of a general advance as deep as 20 miles (32 km) into North Korea.

On 27 March, Ridgway assembled Corps and Division commanders at his Yeoju headquarters and advised them that ceasefire negotiations and future US Government decisions might compel the Eighth Army to adopt a static defense. Because of its inherent rigidity, such a stance would require strong leadership and imaginative tactical thinking, he warned, to stand off a numerically stronger enemy that might not be similarly inhibited in the choice of tactics. The Eighth Army meanwhile would continue to move forward and in the next advance would cross the 38th Parallel. Ridgway agreed with MacArthur's earlier prediction that a stalemate ultimately would develop on the battlefront, but just how far the Eighth Army would drive into North Korea before this occurred, could not be accurately assessed at that time.

Ridgway had revised his concept for advancing above the parallel since meeting with MacArthur on March 24. He planned to point his main attack toward the centrally located road and rail complex marked out by the towns of Pyonggang in the north and Ch'orwon and Gimhwa-eup in the south. This complex, eventually named the Iron Triangle, lay 20 to 30 miles (32 to 48 km) above the 38th Parallel in the diagonal corridor dividing the Taebaek Mountains into northern and southern ranges and containing the major road and rail links between the port of Wonsan in the northeast and Seoul in the southwest. Other routes emanating from the triangle of towns connected with Pyongyang to the northwest and with the western and eastern halves of the present front. A unique center of communications, the complex was of obvious importance to the ability of the enemy high command to move troops and supplies within the forward areas and to coordinate operations laterally.

The first phase of this advance was to occupy ground that could serve as a base both for continuing the advance toward the complex and, in view of the enemy's evident offensive preparations, for developing a defensive position. The base selected, the Kansas Line, followed the lower bank of the Imjin River in the west. From the Imjin eastward as far as the Hwach'on Reservoir the line lay 2 miles (3.2 km) to 6 miles (9.7 km) above the 38th Parallel across the approaches to the Iron Triangle. Following the lower shoreline of the reservoir, it then turned slightly north to a depth of 10 miles (16 km) above the parallel before falling off southeastward to the Yangyang area on the coast. In the advance to the Kansas Line, designated Operation Rugged, US I and IX Corps were to seize the segment of the line between the Imjin and the western edge of the Hwach'on Reservoir. To the east, US X Corps was to occupy the portion tracing the reservoir shore and reaching Route 24 in the Soyang River valley, and the Republic of Korea Army (ROKA) III and I Corps were to take the section between Route 24 and Yangyang.

In anticipation of enemy offensive operations, Ridgway planned to pull substantial forces off the line immediately after reaching the Kansas Line and prepare them for counter-attacks. IX Corps was to release the US 1st Cavalry Division. The division was to assemble at Kyongan-ni, below the Han River south-east of Seoul, and prepare to meet enemy attacks aimed at the capital via Route 1 from the north-west, over Routes 33 and 3 from the north, or through the Bukhan River valley from the north-east. In the X Corps' zone, the bulk of the US 2nd Infantry Division was to assemble at Hongch'on ready to counter an attack following the Route 29 axis, and a division yet to be selected from one of the two ROK Corps in the east was to assemble at Yuch'on-ni on Route 20 and prepare to operate against enemy attacks in either Corps sector. The 187th Airborne Regimental Combat Team (187th RCT), which had left the I Corps' zone for Taegu on 29 March, meanwhile was to be ready to return north to reinforce operations wherever needed.

While these forces established themselves in reserve, Ridgway planned to launch Operation Dauntless, a limited advance toward the Iron Triangle by I and IX Corps. With the objective only of menacing the triangle, not of investing it, the two corps were to attack in succession to Lines Utah and Wyoming. They would create, in effect, a broad salient bulging above the Kansas Line between the Imjin River and Hwach'on Reservoir and reaching prominent heights commanding the Ch'orwon-Kumhwa base of the communications complex. If struck by strong enemy attacks during or after the advance, the two corps were to return to the Kansas Line.

On 3 April, Ridgway updated MacArthur on the operational plans. MacArthur agreed with the Operation Rugged and Operation Dauntless concept, urging in particular that Ridgway make a strong effort to hold the Kansas Line. At the same time, MacArthur believed that the two operations would move the battlefront to that "point of theoretical stalemate" he had predicted in early March. Once Ridgway's forces reached their Kansas-Wyoming objectives MacArthur intended to limit UN operations to reconnaissance and combat patrols, none larger than a battalion.

Ridgway set an opening date for Operation Dauntless late on 9 April, after all but X and ROKA III Corps had reached the Kansas Line. While those two corps continued what had proved a battle more with terrain than with the Korean People's Army (KPA), I and IX Corps forces were to start toward the Iron Triangle on the 11th. Utah, the initial objective line, arched 11 miles (18 km) above Kansas between the Imjin River and the eastern slopes of Kungmang Mountain, its trace resting on the prominent Kumhak, Kwangdok and Paegun mountain masses. The opening phase thus would be primarily an I Corps operation involving attacks by the US 3rd, 24th and 25th Divisions while requiring only a short advance by the British 27th Brigade at the left of IX Corps.

On 11 April MacArthur was removed from UN command and Ridgway was appointed in his place with General James Van Fleet assuming command of 8th Army on 14 April.

== Operation ==
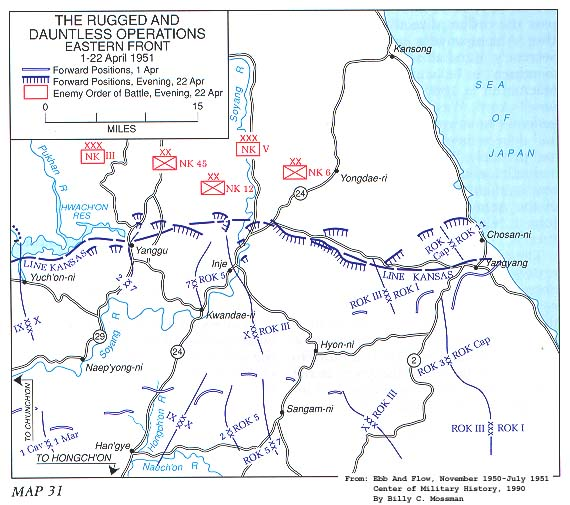
Operations Rugged and Dauntless eastern front map

=== Advance to the Kansas and Utah Lines ===
Since occupying positions around Yangyang above the Kansas Line on 10 April, the ROKA I Corps had had no contact on its front, and on the 11th a company from the 29th Regiment, 9th Division, had patrolled some 15 miles (24 km) north of Yangyang without encountering enemy forces. The KPA 69th Brigade had been taken off the line and disbanded, and the KPA 2nd Division, now responsible for the coastal area, had yet to deploy forces in contact. The untested ROKA 11th Infantry Division joined ROKA I Corps. In the ROKA III Corps zone high in the Taebaek Mountains, the ROKA 3rd Infantry Division, despite having to be resupplied entirely by air and porters in the virtually roadless mountains, had beaten back detachments of the KPA 45th Division to reach the Kansas Line on 14 April, and its patrols since then had encountered few enemy forces above the line.

To the west, the three divisions of the X Corps were just beginning to consolidate positions along the Kansas Line on 16 April. Since the 10th, after it became obvious that KPA 1st Division forces opposite the Corps' left were withdrawing hastily eastward from the ground below the Hwach'on Reservoir, the US 23rd Infantry Regiment, 2nd Division had swung east along the lower shore in pursuit. Abandoned ammunition, food supplies, and a fully stocked aid station evidenced the enemy's haste. Ahead of the pursuing forces, the bulk of the KPA 1st Regiment (also known as the 14th Regiment) crossed the reservoir at a narrow point 3 miles (4.8 km) north-west of Yanggu, using boats and rafts that were burned after the crossing; the remainder moved to Yanggu and then north around the eastern end of the reservoir. Leading forces of the 23rd Infantry entered Yanggu and reached the Kansas Line on 15 April.

The strongest KPA resistance encountered just above the Soyang River by the 7th Infantry Division at X Corps' center and the ROKA 5th Division at the right had begun to dissolve on 13 April. The 5th Division cleared KPA 45th Division forces out of their defenses around Inje on the 15th, and after artillery pounded the ridges north of town during the night, dawn attacks carried the ROKA to the Kansas Line with negligible contact. The US 17th Infantry Regiment, advancing on the 7th Division's left through decreasing opposition from KPA 15th Division forces, found Route 29 leading into Yanggu obstructed by booby-trapped fallen trees and cleverly placed wooden box mines but reached the Kansas Line and made contact with the 2nd Division in Yanggu on the 15th/16th. On the division's right, the US 32nd Infantry Regiment pushed through brief but sharp resistance to reach the line early on 17 April.

Beginning on the 17th, X Corps' patrols ranging above the Kansas Line found progressively fewer enemy forces. X Corps commander, General Edward Almond attempted to follow the KPA withdrawal by establishing forward patrol bases in all division zones, whence strong patrols were to advance farther north each day in search of KPA positions. As of 20 April the patrolling had reached a depth of about 2 miles (3.2 km) without meeting significant resistance.

On the opposite side of the Hwach'on Reservoir, IX Corps' patrols sent forward of the Kansas Line by the ROKA 6th and 1st Marine Divisions began to bring back reports of PVA withdrawal when forces engaged in Operation Dauntless to the west drew closer to the Utah Line. By 17 April the 1st Korean Marine Corps Regiment, which had replaced the 7th Cavalry Regiment after the latter's unsuccessful effort to capture the Hwacheon Dam, established outposts near the dam on the ridge inside the Pukhan loop and on heights above the Pukhan to the west. On the 18th a Marine patrol crossing the Pukhan 4 miles (6.4 km) west of the dam found Hwacheon town on Route 17 unoccupied except for 11 Chinese People's Volunteer Army (PVA) soldiers, whom the patrol took captive. Intelligence officers appraised the voluntary withdrawal ahead of the two IX Corps' divisions as a realignment of forces with those dropping back in the Dauntless sector, but did not overlook the possibility that the PVA were coaxing the IX Corps into a vulnerable deployment. A recently captured document, dated 17 March, extolled the virtues and explained the purpose of "roving defensive warfare," defined as defense through movement without regard for the loss or gain of ground which could "conserve our own power, deplete the enemy's strength, and secure for us more favorable conditions for future victory."

By 17 April, the first phase of Operation Dauntless had been successfully achieved. On the east flank of the advance, the 27th British Commonwealth Brigade of IX Corps had cleared minor PVA 40th Army forces from Paegun Mountain above the headwaters of the Kap'yong River to reach the Utah Line on 16 April. The ROKA 19th Regiment, 6th Division was currently relieving the brigade, which, except for the New Zealand artillery assigned to stay forward in support of the ROKA, was withdrawing into corps reserve near Kap'yong town. The relief in part was in preparation for the second phase of Dauntless in which IX Corps would make a full advance with the ROKA 6th and 1st Marine Divisions. While in reserve, the 27th Brigade also was to begin rotating units under a Commonwealth policy calling for annual replacement. The 1st Battalion, The Argyll and Sutherland Highlanders, would eventually be replaced on 23 April, by the 1st Battalion, King's Own Scottish Borderers; on the 25th, brigade headquarters itself would leave the line during the Battle of Kapyong and be replaced by a new staff and commander from Hong Kong. The brigade at that time would become the 28th British Commonwealth Brigade under the command of Brigadier George Taylor.

On the west flank of the Dauntless area, at approximately I Corps' center, the US 65th Infantry Regiment of the 3rd Division, reinforced by the Philippine 10th Battalion Combat Team and two companies of the 64th Tank Battalion, had easily defeated PVA 26th Army detachments in a narrow zone between the Imjin River and Route 33 to reach the Utah Line on 14 April. In the right half of the Corps' zone, delaying forces of the 26th and 40th Armies had been more reluctant to give way before the 25th and 24th Divisions advancing toward Ch'orwon and Kumhwa. The 25th Division spent four days crossing the Hantan River and getting a foothold in the Pogae-San heights, a series of steep north-south ridges between Routes 33 and 3, and needed two days more to cover half the 10 miles (16 km) distance between the Kansas and Utah Lines. East of Route 3, the 24th Division attacking through the Kwangdok-san ridges shouldering the Yongp'yong River gained scarcely 1 mile (1.6 km) in three days. But by 17 April resistance weakened in both division zones. On that date a company of the 6th Tank Battalion, 24th Division, moved up Route 3 within 7 miles (11 km) of Kumhwa without contact. On the following day, in the 25th Division zone, a battalion of the 35th Infantry, two companies of the 89th Tank Battalion and an artillery battery moved through the upper Hantan River valley within 1 mile (1.6 km) of Ch'orwon before receiving fire. Impeded by rough ground, heavy rains, and somewhat stiffer resistance beginning on 19 April, the two divisions were on the Utah Line on the 20th except at the left of the 25th Division where enemy delaying forces held up the attached Turkish Brigade along Route 33.

By 20 April, the western I Corps' front lay along 30 miles (48 km) of the meandering Imjin, from its mouth northeastward to a point on Route 33 10 miles (16 km) below Ch'orwon. At the left, the ROKA 1st Division sat astride Route 1 with its tank destroyer battalion (still organized and fighting as an infantry unit) and 11th and 12th Regiments stretched out from the mouth of the Imjin to the river's Korangp'o-ri bend 15 miles (24 km) upstream. The 3rd Division occupied the Korangp'o-ri Route 33 sector with the attached British 29th Brigade adjacent to the ROKA division and the 65th Infantry on the ground taken during its recent advance. It was a gaping front, manned for the most part in a series of separated battalion strongpoints.

As the Imjin River front had developed to its present width since the beginning of the month, the two divisions manning it had patrolled extensively above the river. The patrols encountered thinly disposed forces of the KPA 8th Division along the far bank, most of them ahead of the ROK 1st Division, until the 10th, when they discovered that the KPA had vacated their positions. ROKA patrols later moved along Route 1 as far as Kaesong, the medieval capital of Korea some 12 miles (19 km) above the Imjin, without making contact. The 8th Division appeared to have joined the remainder of the KPA I Corps west of the Ryesong River.

Other ROKA 1st Division and British 29th Brigade patrols ranging up to 5 miles (8.0 km) above the Imjin after 10 April began to encounter a sprinkling of PVA, mostly across the 10 miles (16 km) British front between Korangp'o-ri and a near ninety-degree bend in the river where its flow changes from south-east to south-west and where it receives the water of the west flowing Hantan. Although intelligence agents had in the meantime identified the PVA XIX Army Group in the general Kumch'on-Kuhwa-ri area and had discovered the neighboring PVA III Army Group (but misidentified it as the XVIII Army Group), the minor engagements within 5 miles (8.0 km) of the river were the first indication that any of these forces had displaced forward. Five prisoners taken at scattered locations between 11 and 14 April, all belonged to the 561st Regiment, 187th Division, 63rd Army of the XIX Army Group. One prisoner stated at interrogation that the 561st had a defensive mission pending the arrival of reinforcements. The light contact and wide dispersion of a single regiment did suggest a screen, but as ROKA and British patrols continued to probe the thin enemy positions through 20 April, no evidence appeared of PVA forces massing behind them.

The most visible evidence of enemy activity appeared as Eighth Army forces closed on the Kansas and Utah Lines were billows of smoke rising at numerous points ahead of them. By mid-April, belts of smoke up to 10 miles (16 km) deep lay before much of the I, IX and X Corps fronts. Air observers confirmed that enemy troops, some in groups of 50 to 500, were setting fire to grasslands and brush. Some observers reported that smoke generators also were being used. Fires doused by rain showers were rekindled. Sea air that frequently stagnated over the battlefront, added sea haze and moisture to the smoke and produced smog. On a number of days-varying from sector to sector rain, haze, fog, smog and particularly smoke hampered ground and air observation, the delivery of air strikes, and the adjustment of artillery fire. Though the smoke was intended to shield daylight troop movements, there was not much evidence that enemy forces were moving toward the front. During the last three days of the advance to the Utah Line the 65th Infantry captured a member of the 181st Division, part of the 60th Army of the III Army Group. Two prisoners taken by the 24th and 25th Divisions were from different regiments of the 81st Division, which belonged to the 27th Army of the IX Army Group. One of the latter told his captors that his unit would be committed to offensive operations after the 27th Army finished relieving the 26th. By 20 April these three prisoners and the sprinkling of PVA discovered above the Imjin were the only indications that fresh forces might have moved forward under the smoke.

To give some order of probability to the opening of the expected enemy offensive, Eighth Army Intelligence Officer Colonel Tarkenton advised Van Fleet on 18 April, that a "survey of all sources," while failing to indicate conclusively any specific date or period for the initial attack, pointed to 20 April, through 1 May. Tarkenton considered the latter date especially significant since it was the "most important day of the year to International Communism." Having learned that two fresh army groups (the XIX and III) were in the general Kumch'on-Koksan-Ich'on area, he believed the "greatest enemy potential" for a major attack to be from the north and northwest across the Imjin. As of the 20th, however, I Corps' patrols had seen no signs of offensive preparations in this sector, nor had any evidence that the PVA was about to attack appeared elsewhere. Incoming reports to Van Fleet from Corps' commanders and Tarkenton's own daily intelligence summaries all described enemy forces as maintaining a "defensive attitude."

Since all units were on or near their Utah and Kansas objectives, and since there was no clear sign that the impending enemy offensive would start immediately, Van Fleet elected to open the second phase of Operation Dauntless. In notifying Ridgway that I and IX Corps would move toward the Wyoming Line on 21 April, Van Fleet also proposed that X, ROKA III and I Corps attack to secure the segment of Route 24 running northeast ahead of ROKA III and I Corps to a junction with the coastal highway near the town of Kansong, 23 miles (37 km) above Yangyang. This move would give the two ROKA Corps a supply route in the higher Taebaeks, needed in particular by ROKA III Corps. To secure the road, Van Fleet wanted to hinge an advance at the eastern end of the Hwacheon Reservoir and swing the forces between the reservoir and the coast northwestward to the Alabama Line 7 miles (11 km) to 14 miles (23 km) above Route 24. Ridgway approved a sweep that would achieve the same end but with a substantially shorter eastern arc. Van Fleet set the 24th as the opening date.

=== Advance to the Alabama and Wyoming Lines ===
The I Corps' final Dauntless objectives lay in the zones of the 25th and 24th Divisions stretching north of the Utah Line to Ch'orwon and Kumhwa at the base of the Iron Triangle. Ahead of the ROKA 6th Division and 1st Marine Division in the IX Corps' zone, the Wyoming Line curved southeast from the Kumhwa area to the Hwacheon Reservoir. On the 21st the two IX Corps' divisions moved 2 miles (3.2 km) to 5 miles (8.0 km) above the Kansas Line against almost no opposition. Immediately west, the 24th Division did not test the opposition below Kumhwa, but deliberately stood fast in the Kwangdok-san ridges to allow the neighboring ROKA 6th Division to come abreast. In the Pogae-san heights, the 25th Division attacked toward Ch'orwon, but made no substantial progress after receiving increasing artillery fire during the day and becoming involved in hard fights right at the Utah Line, especially in the zone of the Turkish Brigade along Route 33.

Neither Corps developed evidence of enemy offensive preparations during the day. The absence of opposition in the IX Corps' zone only confirmed the recent patrol reports of withdrawal. Below the Iron Triangle, the resistance that began to stiffen on 19 April had been expected to grow progressively heavier as I Corps' forces moved above the Utah Line. On the Imjin front, daylight patrols working above the river again found only a scattering of PVA. Milburn concluded in an evening wrap-up report to Van Fleet that the "enemy attitude remains defensive."

The only appreciable change in enemy activity on the 21st occurred east of the Hwacheon Reservoir in the X Corps' zone. North and northeast of Yanggu, 2nd and 7th Division patrols, after several days of nearly fruitless searches, located several groups of 600-1,000 KPA immediately above the Corps' front. These groups suggested, as Almond reported to Van Fleet, that a relief or reinforcement of enemy units was taking place. On the 21st, the Eighth Army G-2 reported that his information still was not firm enough to "indicate the nearness" of the impending enemy offensive with any degree of certainty. A worrisome fact, as he earlier had pointed out to Van Fleet, was that a lack of offensive signs did not necessarily mean that the opening of the offensive was distant. In preparing past attacks, PVA forces had successfully concealed their locations until they moved into forward assembly areas immediately before they attacked. The first indication that the enemy would repeat this pattern appeared during the night when I Corps' patrols reconnoitering above the Imjin ran into PVA positions that were stronger and nearer the river than those encountered during past searches. There was no question that the XIX Army Group was setting out a covering force.

More evidence appeared on 22 April, as I and IX Corps continued their advance toward the Wyoming Line. The progress of the attack resembled that on the previous day, IX Corps' forces making easy moves of 2–3 miles (3.2–4.8 km), the two I Corps divisions being limited to shorter gains by heavier resistance. On the east flank of the advance, the Hwacheon Dam, defended so stoutly by PVA 39th Army forces only a few days earlier, fell to the 1st Korean Marine Corps Regiment without a fight. But a PVA captive taken elsewhere in the 1st Marine Division zone during the afternoon told interrogators that an attack would open before the day was out. In mid-afternoon the ROKA 6th Division captured several members of the PVA 60th Division and, immediately west, the 24th Division took captives from the PVA 59th Division. These two divisions belonged to the fresh 20th Army. The full IX Army Group had reached the front. In the 25th Division zone on the west flank of the advance, six PVA who blundered into the hands of the Turkish Brigade along Route 33 during the afternoon were members of a survey party from the 2nd Motorized Artillery Division. The division's guns, according to the officer in charge, were being positioned to support an attack scheduled to start after dark.

For the scheduled advance to the Alabama Line east of the Hwacheon Reservoir, the X Corps/ROKA III Corps boundary was to be shifted 4 miles (6.4 km) west at noon on 23 April, to give the ROKA III Corps, which had been operating with only the ROKA 3rd Division on line, a two-division front. The III Corps' reserve division, the ROKA 7th Division, began occupying the added frontage on the 22nd, its 5th Regiment relieving the ROKA 36th Regiment, 5th Division and the X Corps' right early in the evening. On 23 April, the incoming division's 3rd Regiment was to move into a 2 miles (3.2 km) gap directly above Inje between the 5th Regiment and the 35th Regiment, now the right flank unit of the 5th Division. The latter's 36th Regiment meanwhile assembled 3 miles (4.8 km) below its former position in preparation for moving west into the redrawn 5th Division zone the following day as the remainder of the ROKA 7th Division came into its new area.

A similar shifting of KPA forces above the X and ROK III Corps was indicated when the ROKA 5th Division, previously in contact with the KPA 45th Division, III Corps above Inje, captured a member of the KPA 12th Division, V Corps. Farther east, the ROKA 3rd Division, which had had almost no contact since reaching the Kansas Line, received hard local attacks that drove in its outposts and pressed its main line before easing in the evening of 22 April. Thus the KPA III Corps could be shifting west toward the reservoir and the KPA V Corps returning to the line from a point above Inje eastward.

Aerial reconnaissance after daybreak on 22 April, reported a general forward displacement of enemy formations from rear assemblies northwest of I Corps and north of both I and IX Corps, also extensive troop movements, both north and south, on the roads above Yanggu and Inje east of the Hwacheon Reservoir. Though air strikes punished the moving troops bodies, air observers reported the southward march of enemy groups with increasing frequency during the day. On the basis of the sightings west of the Hwacheon Reservoir, it appeared that the enemy forces approaching I Corps would mass evenly across the corps front while those moving toward IX Corps would concentrate on the front of the ROKA 6th Division.

Civilians entering I Corps' lines from the northwest confirmed the enemy approach from that direction, and through the day British 29th Brigade forces along the Imjin observed enemy patrols investigating the north bank of the river for crossing sites. The 3rd Division meanwhile found evidence that the PVA III Army Group was included in the forward displacement when a patrol operating north along Route 33 above the division's right flank picked up a member of the 34th Division, which belonged to the group's 12th Army.

At 17:00, 25th Division air observers reported a long column of trucks, some towing artillery pieces, moving down Route 33 toward the Turkish Brigade. Aircraft and artillery attacked the trucks until they dispersed off the road into wooded areas. By 18:00 PVA infantry were seen on Route 33 marching south in close column and just before dark were observed occupying foxholes along the sides of the road. Ten batteries of artillery kept the road and the suspected enemy artillery positions under fire. Immediately east, artillery pilots spotted PVA columns nearing 24th Division lines late in the afternoon and brought them under fire as they came within range. The approaching forces simply accepted casualties as they massed above the center of the division front. At 19:00 the division commander, General Blackshear M. Bryan, notified I Corps' headquarters that he expected to be attacked in about two hours. "I think this is what we have been waiting for," he added. Bryan's prediction of attack on the 24th Division proved correct. The initial assault of the PVA/KPA spring offensive opened at 18:00.

== Aftermath ==
On the night of 22 April, the PVA opened their Spring Offensive pushing back the UN forces across the entire front, erasing all the gains of Operations Dauntless and Rugged. The UN forces retreated to the defensive positions prepared by Ridgway earlier, the No-Name Line north of Seoul. The Eighth Army counterattacked in May–June regaining the Kansas Line.

== See also ==
- Operation Courageous
- Operation Rugged
- Chinese Spring Offensive
- UN May–June 1951 counteroffensive
