= Operation Rugged =

UN military operation in the Korean War

- Part of the Korean War
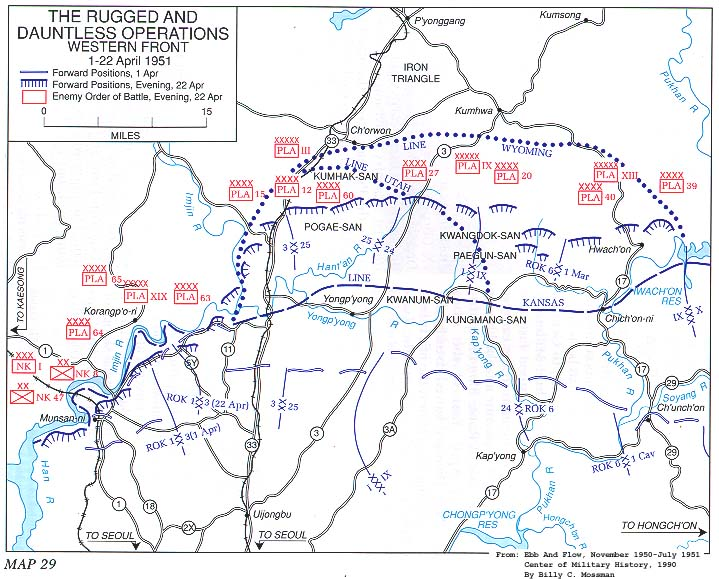
- Operations Rugged and Dauntless western front map
Date	1–9 April 1951
Location	Imjin River and Hwach'on Reservoir
Result	See Aftermath

Belligerents
United Nations: United States; South Korea; United Kingdom	China; North Korea

Commanders and leaders
(United Nations) Douglas MacArthur (United States) Matthew Ridgway (United States) Frank W. Milburn (United States) William M. Hoge	Unknown

Strength
(United States) I Corps (United States) IX Corps	

Operation Rugged was a military operation performed by the United Nations Command (UN) during the Korean War designed to advance the UN lines to positions north of the 38th Parallel designated the Kansas Line. The operation would be the first phase of the advance, being immediately succeeded by Operation Dauntless which would take the UN forces to the Wyoming Line 10 miles (16 km) to 20 miles (32 km) north of the 38th Parallel.

== Background ==
On 22 March, following the successful conclusion of Operation Courageous, US Eighth Army commander Lieutenant General Matthew Ridgway notified UN forces commander General Douglas MacArthur that he was developing plans for an advance that would take Eighth Army forces 10 to 20 miles (16 to 32 km) above the 38th Parallel to a general line following the upstream trace of the Ryesong River as far as Sibyon-ni (38.309°N 126.695°E) in the west, falling off gently southeastward to the Hwach'on Reservoir, then running east to the coast. As in past and current operations, the objective would be the destruction of enemy troops and materiel. MacArthur approved Ridgway's concept but also scheduled a visit to Korea for 24 March, when he would have an opportunity to discuss the plans in more detail.

Upon his return to Tokyo late on 24 March, following his conference with Ridgway and a visit to the front, MacArthur announced that he had directed the Eighth Army to cross the 38th Parallel "if and when its security makes it tactically advisable. More specifically MacArthur had approved Ridgway’s concept of a general advance as deep as twenty miles into North Korea.

On 27 March, Ridgway assembled Corps and Division commanders at his Yeoju headquarters and advised them that ceasefire negotiations and future US Government decisions might compel the Eighth Army to adopt a static defense. Because of its inherent rigidity, such a stance would require strong leadership and imaginative tactical thinking, he warned, to stand off a numerically stronger enemy that might not be similarly inhibited in the choice of tactics. The Eighth Army meanwhile would continue to move forward and in the next advance would cross the 38th Parallel. Ridgway agreed with MacArthur's earlier prediction that a stalemate ultimately would develop on the battlefront, but just how far the Eighth Army would drive into North Korea before this occurred, could not be accurately assessed at that time.

Ridgway had revised his concept for advancing above the parallel since meeting with MacArthur on 24 March. He planned to point his main attack toward the centrally located road and rail complex marked out by the towns of Pyonggang in the north and Ch'orwon and Gimhwa-eup in the south. This complex, eventually named the Iron Triangle, lay 20 to 30 miles (32 to 48 km) above the 38th Parallel in the diagonal corridor dividing the Taebaek Mountains into northern and southern ranges and containing the major road and rail links between the port of Wonsan in the north-east and Seoul in the south-west. Other routes emanating from the triangle of towns connected with Pyongyang to the northwest and with the western and eastern halves of the present front. A unique center of communications, the complex was of obvious importance to the ability of the enemy high command to move troops and supplies within the forward areas and to coordinate operations laterally.

The first phase of this advance was to occupy ground that could serve as a base both for continuing the advance toward the complex and, in view of the enemy's evident offensive preparations, for developing a defensive position. The base selected, the Kansas Line, followed the lower bank of the Imjin River in the west. From the Imjin eastward as far as the Hwach'on Reservoir the line lay 2 miles (3.2 km) to 6 miles (9.7 km) above the 38th Parallel across the approaches to the Iron Triangle. Following the lower shoreline of the reservoir, it then turned slightly north to a depth of 10 miles (16 km) above the parallel before falling off southeastward to the Yangyang area on the coast. In the advance to the Kansas Line, designated Operation Rugged, US I and IX Corps were to seize the segment of the line between the Imjin and the western edge of the Hwach'on Reservoir. To the east, US X Corps was to occupy the portion tracing the reservoir shore and reaching Route 24 in the Soyang River valley, and the Republic of Korea Army (ROKA) III and I Corps were to take the section between Route 24 and Yangyang.

In anticipation of enemy offensive operations, Ridgway planned to pull substantial forces off the line immediately after reaching the Kansas Line and prepare them for counterattacks. IX Corps was to release the US 1st Cavalry Division. The division was to assemble at Kyongan-ni, below the Han River southeast of Seoul, and prepare to meet enemy attacks aimed at the capital via Route 1 from the northwest, over Routes 33 and 3 from the north, or through the Bukhan River valley from the northeast. In the X Corps' zone, the bulk of the US 2nd Infantry Division was to assemble at Hongch'on ready to counter an attack following the Route 29 axis, and a division yet to be selected from one of the two ROKA Corps in the east was to assemble at Yuch'on-ni on Route 20 and prepare to operate against enemy attacks in either corps sector. The 187th Airborne Regimental Combat Team (187th RCT), which had left the I Corps' zone for Taegu on 29 March, meanwhile was to be ready to return north to reinforce operations wherever needed.

While these forces established themselves in reserve, Ridgway planned to launch Operation Dauntless, a limited advance toward the Iron Triangle by I and IX Corps. With the objective only of menacing the triangle, not of investing it, the two Corps were to attack in succession to Lines Utah and Wyoming. They would create, in effect, a broad salient bulging above the Kansas Line between the Imjin River and Hwach'on Reservoir and reaching prominent heights commanding the Ch'orwon-Kumhwa base of the communications complex. If struck by strong enemy attacks during or after the advance, the two Corps were to return to the Kansas Line.

To maintain, and in some areas regain, contact with enemy forces, Ridgway allowed each corps to start toward the Kansas Line as it completed preparations. The Operation Rugged advance, as a result, staggered to a full start between 2 and 5 April. On 3 April, Ridgway updated MacArthur on the operational plans. MacArthur agreed with the Operation Rugged and Operation Dauntless concept, urging in particular that Ridgway make a strong effort to hold the Kansas Line. At the same time, MacArthur believed that the two operations would move the battlefront to that "point of theoretical stalemate" he had predicted in early March. Once Ridgway's forces reached their Kansas-Wyoming objectives MacArthur intended to limit UN operations to reconnaissance and combat patrols, none larger than a battalion.

== Operation ==
Ridgway had widened the I Corps' zone eastward to pass control of the US 24th Infantry Division, which had been operating on the IX Corps' left, to I Corps commanded by General Frank W. Milburn. While Milburn's forces along the Imjin River stood fast, the 24th and 25th Infantry Divisions in the eastern half of the I Corps' zone attacked north on either side of Route 3 on the morning of 3 April. East of the road, the 24th Division moved astride the Yongp'yong River valley, the 5th Infantry Regiment on the left advancing into the Kwanum Mountain mass abutting Route 3, the 21st Infantry Regiment striking for Kungmang Mountain just inside the right Corps' boundary. West of Route 3, the 27th and 35th Infantry Regiments of the 25th Division advanced toward high ground rising between a lateral stretch of the Yongp'yong River and the Hantan River farther north.

Pushing scattered People's Volunteer Army (PVA) 26th Army forces out of position by fire and occasionally by assault, and turning back a few light counterattacks, the 25th Division took the heights overlooking the Hantan River on 5 April. Resistance to the 24th Division was desultory except at the far right where the 2nd Battalion, 21st Infantry, stalled on the western slopes of Kungmang Mountain on 4 April, under fire from a strong PVA 40th Army force dug in on the crest behind barbed wire and antipersonnel mines. The battalion finally cleared the position after air strikes and artillery fire had softened it on the morning of 5 April. The 5th Infantry occupied the Kwanum Mountain mass that same day; slowed by the Kungmang battle, the 21st Infantry reached the Kansas Line on 6 April.

The adjoining British 27th Brigade following the Kap'yong River valley on the IX Corps' left was stopped by PVA fire from Kungmang Mountain until the 21st Infantry reduced that position; then the British marched unopposed to the Kansas Line on 6 April. Flushing scattered PVA out of the IX Corps' central zone, the ROKA 6th Infantry Division reached its Kansas objectives the same day. On the Corps' right, where the 1st Cavalry Division advanced astride the Pukhan River, the attached 7th Marine Regiment moved easily up the west side of the river, but the 7th and 8th Cavalry Regiments attacking through cut-up, virtually roadless ground east of the Pukhan were slowed by strong delaying forces of the PVA 39th Army. On 6 April the two cavalry regiments were still some 3 miles (4.8 km) short of their Kansas Line objectives adjacent to the Hwach'on Reservoir.

=== Hwach'on Reservoir ===
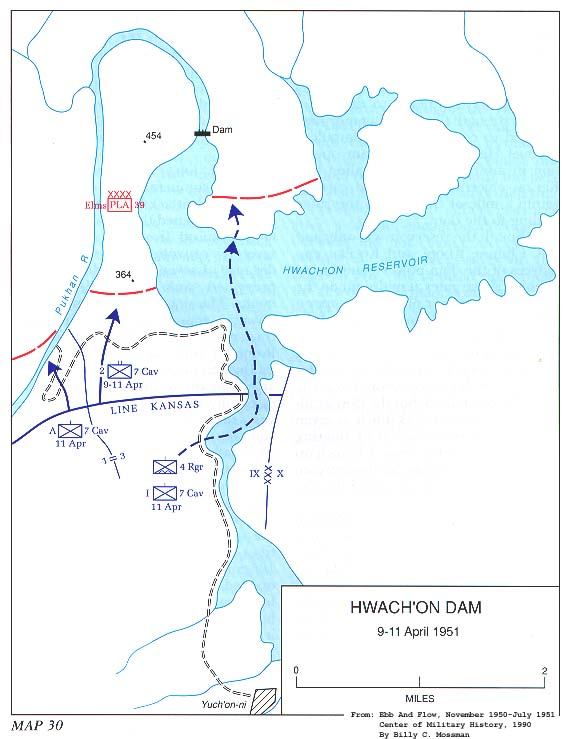
Hwachon Reservoir map

Ridgway suspected that the stiff resistance to the 1st Cavalry Division was related to enemy plans to obstruct IX Corps' movement by releasing the reservoir's water through the Hwacheon Dam and flooding the Pukhan. The water was far from its maximum level, but air observers recently had noted that the dam's eighteen sluice gates were closed. The PVA were intent on keeping the Cavalry away from the reservoir to give the water time to rise before releasing it.

As the advance got under way, the IX Corps' engineer calculated that simultaneously opening all sluice gates and penstocks when the reservoir was full would raise the Pukhan 10-foot (3.0 m) to 12-foot (3.7 m) in the vicinity of the Kansas Line and would flood much of the Chuncheon basin. Although the flooding would not be disastrous, it would temporarily disrupt lateral movement in the Corps' zone and north-south traffic on Route 17, IX Corps' main supply route; moreover, this harassment could be repeated as long as the dam remained in enemy hands. Ridgway, in light of these prospects, adjusted his plans to include the dam as an objective.

The dam stood at the northwest corner of the reservoir, its spillway slanting north into a deep, narrow gorge through which the Pukhan at that point coursed north and then turned west and south to form a horseshoe-shaped loop. The structure abutted on two narrow-ridge peninsulas, one protruding south into the reservoir on the east, the other located in the loop of the Pukhan on the west. The western peninsula, which offered the only overland approach to the dam, jutted beyond the Kansas Line at the right of IX Corps; the dam itself rested above the Kansas Line at the X Corps' left. Ridgway shifted the boundary between the two Corps eastward to put both approach and objective in the IX Corps' zone and instructed Corps commander General William M. Hoge to seize the dam. With the reservoir level well below maximum, Ridgway attached no urgency to the seizure; he adjusted the Wyoming Line to include the dam, making it an objective not of Rugged but of Operation Dauntless to follow. As a Dauntless objective, the dam's capture would fall to the 1st Marine Division, scheduled to relieve the 1st Cavalry Division after the latter reached the Kansas Line.

Hoge elected a different course after the 4th Ranger Company joined IX Corps on 7 April. Hoge considered the specially trained company the ideal unit to put the dam gates out of commission. Hoge visualized a raid in which the Rangers would sneak to the dam along the reservoir side of the western peninsula, immobilize the gate machinery with all gates closed, and withdraw, all within two to four hours. Attaching the company to the 1st Cavalry Division, he instructed General Charles D. Palmer to use the Rangers against the dam before the division left the Kansas Line, but did not specifically direct or limit the operation to a Ranger raid.

Unaware of Hoge's concept of a hit and run attack, Palmer assigned the mission to Colonel Harris' 7th Cavalry Regiment, then struggling through the rough ground directly below the dam, and instructed Harris to immobilize the sluice gates and occupy the dam area. Harris assigned the mission to his 2nd Battalion, then in reserve, and on 8 April, assembled the battalion with the 4th Ranger Company attached close to the front almost due south of the peninsular approach to the dam. He left detailed planning for later on the assumption that success in achieving the Kansas Line, and thus the dam operation, was some days away. Increasing resistance on 7 and 8 April, did portend a slow advance to the line. In an attempt to accelerate the attack, late on 8 April, Palmer ordered his two assault regiments to deploy in greater strength the following morning. Obliged to commit the 2nd Battalion, Harris, with the dam operation in mind, gave the battalion the Kansas Line objectives that would carry it within 1 mile (1.6 km) of the base of the ridge leading to the dam.

Although the reservoir was only half full, PVA troops and Korean employees of the dam power plant began opening sluice gates at midnight on the 8th. With the power plant not in operation, they were able to open only four gates fully and raise six slightly. The released water cost had limited impact as Hoge earlier had warned his forces away from the Pukhan bottomland, but the flow gradually raised the river as much as 7-foot (2.1 m), forcing the removal of floating bridges above and below Chuncheon and destroying another far downstream before it could be swung into the bank.

The only PVA troops below the Pukhan on the morning of the 9th occupied the ridge leading to the dam. Elsewhere, those who had opposed the advance of the 7th and 8th Cavalry Regiments had withdrawn behind the river during the night to avoid being trapped below the flood. The two regiments were able to reach the Kansas Line well before noon. Eager to shut down the dam, Hoge ordered Palmer to open the operation immediately. Since Hoge also set the 10th as the date the Marines would relieve the 1st Cavalry Division, Palmer instructed Harris to try to complete the operation by day's end.

Lieutenant colonel John Callaway, the 2nd Battalion commander, opened a hastily planned attack early in the afternoon. He opened the attack with inevitably reduced fire support since the severely convoluted ground for a distance of 7 miles (11 km) below the dam prevented tank and artillery movements. The single road serving the 7th Cavalry, actually no more than a narrow mountain track, branched off Route 29 in the adjoining zone of the 2nd Division to the east, entered the 7th's area near the southwest corner of the reservoir, ran north along the reservoir shore to a point beyond the Kansas Line, then turned west through a small valley at the base of the ridge leading to the dam. Rock outcroppings so confined the track at points that jeeps could barely negotiate it. With the division artillery positions as far north as the terrain allowed, Callaway's objectives were beyond the range of the 4.1-inch (100 mm) howitzers. After the PVA opened the sluice gates, division artillerymen managed to get one 4.1-inch (100 mm). howitzer into a position from which it could reach the dam at maximum range. While the howitzer might discourage the PVA from further work on the dam, its fire at extreme range could not effectively support Callaway's attack.

The 2nd Battalion advanced with Company F leading the attack to clear the ridge as far as Hill 454, which overlooked the dam. When Company F moved up the ridge, Company E, the battalion reserve, was to occupy Hill 364 at the ridge's southern end. Once Company F occupied Hill 454, the 4th Ranger Company was to move to the dam following the edge of the reservoir, close and immobilize the gates, and occupy high ground on the peninsula east of the dam. Meanwhile, to assist resupply and the displacement of the battalion's heavy weapons, Company G began to clear a segment of the regimental supply road running north along the reservoir and west through the valley at the foot of the approach ridge. After crossing the valley road, Company F stalled under mortar, small arms, and machine gun fire from Hill 364 and from mutually supporting bunkers on heights above the Pukhan to the northwest. A single air strike called down by Callaway did little to dampen the fire. Though ample cover prevented heavy casualties, Company F remained pinned until dark, then was able to withdraw south of the valley.

Although the 1st Cavalry Division was due to leave the line on the 10th, Hoge and Palmer wanted another attack made on the dam. Hoge continued to visualize a raid; Palmer was certain that Callaway's battalion could have reached the dam on the 9th if more daylight had been available. Accordingly, while the remainder of the division began to move out of the Corps' zone on the morning of the 10th, the 7th Cavalry remained on line while the 2nd Battalion made a second attempt. Believing that the PVA did not hold the ridge in strength and perhaps had withdrawn as other delaying forces had done in other instances after a single engagement, Callaway did not change tactics. The narrowness and steep sides of the ridge in any case allowed little room for any other formation or maneuver. Again his lead company, this time Company G, was pinned down by fire from the north and north-west after crossing the road at the base of the ridge. Still without normal artillery support and now denied air support because of mist and lowhanging clouds, Callaway was unable to quiet the fire and continue north.

Palmer and Harris had expected that the 7th Cavalry, regardless of the outcome of Callaway's second attack, would be relieved by Marines immediately afterward. Harris, in fact, had allowed his 3rd Battalion to start assembling for the move to the rear. Hoge, however, viewed Callaway's two attempts as halfhearted and ordered a "bona fide" effort against the dam before the 7th left the line.

In ordering a third attempt to be made on the morning of the 11th, Palmer authorized Harris to commit his entire regiment if he thought it necessary. Harris planned to launch a stronger effort in the belief that the PVA defense of the dam consisted of mutually supporting positions in the heights immediately northwest of the Pukhan and on the two peninsulas on which the dam abutted and that reaching the dam required simultaneous attacks in all three areas. But he believed that he had neither sufficient supplies, particularly ammunition, nor the time to accumulate them for a full regimental advance. He planned to send a company of the 1st Battalion in a diversionary attack northwest of the Pukhan, to recommit the 2nd Battalion on the western peninsula, and before dawn to dispatch the 4th Ranger Company reinforced with heavy weapons from Company M across the reservoir to attack up the eastern peninsula. He placed the 3rd Battalion on call to reinforce the Rangers or pass through the 2nd Battalion and occupy the dam site, whichever proved the necessary or better course. Two 8-inch (200 mm) batteries of the 17th Field Artillery Regiment and a 6.1-inch (150 mm). battery of the 1st Marine Division's 4th Field Artillery Battalion were now within range of Harris' objectives, but worsening weather-a mix of rain, sleet, snow, and fog-eliminated air support.

Harris had considered a reservoir crossing operation on the 9th, alerting the 4th Ranger Company to that possibility and setting staff members to getting 20 assault boats from the division's 8th Engineer Combat Battalion. The engineers earlier had acquired amphibious equipment in anticipation of crossing operations at the Pukhan, but before Harris' request reached them they had returned part of the equipment to Chuncheon depots and turned the rest over to the Marines relieving the division on the 10th. Attempts to retrieve equipment and transport it to the reservoir over the poor supply road produced just nine boats and four motors by the time set for the Rangers' crossing. Unable to obtain boat operators and mechanics in time for the operation, Harris hastily recruited from his own regiment men who had had some experience with motorboats.

The Ranger company commander, Captain Dorsey Anderson, embarked two platoons, artillery and mortar observers, and a machine gun section in the first lift. Concealed by darkness and paddling the boats to maintain silence, the first-wave forces reached the eastern peninsula undetected, but were stopped by small arms and machine gun fire when they moved onto high ground above the landing point after daylight. PVA fire striking the following waves of Rangers as they crossed the reservoir in daylight grew heavy enough to force part of the last lift to return to the south shore. Even with the bulk of the company available, Anderson was unable to advance and by midmorning used most of his ammunition in beating off counterattacks. PVA troops meanwhile began moving across the dam from the western peninsula to reinforce those holding up the Rangers.

As Anderson's attack bogged down, Harris ordered the 3rd Battalion to the eastern peninsula. Company I, which had assembled near the Rangers' embarkation point during the night, started across the reservoir about 11:00 (UTC+9) forced by a shortage of boats to cross in increments, slowed to a paddling pace when most of the few outboard motors failed, and harassed by PVA fire, the company was not on the peninsula until midafternoon, and only one platoon by that time had joined the Rangers. Elsewhere, the diversionary attack across the Pukhan ended when intense fire from the northwest blocked all early morning attempts by a Company A patrol to search the still-swollen river for crossing sites. The 2nd Battalion again lost momentum when its lead company, now Company E, stalled at the base of the western ridge under heavy fire from pillboxes above. All attempts to destroy the fortifications with artillery fire failed. With the regiment stopped at every point, Palmer, while Company I was crossing the reservoir to join the Rangers, authorized Harris to call off the attack. But Harris, though he no longer expected to occupy the dam area, deferred ending operations out of hope that by reinforcing the attack on the eastern peninsula he might be able to send Anderson's company in a raid to immobilize the dam's sluice gates.

Following Company I's drawn-out reservoir crossing, however, Harris realized that the shortage of boats and motors would prevent the remainder of the 3rd Battalion from reaching the peninsula before dark. Fearful of losing the Rangers and Company I to a PVA night attack, he ordered them to withdraw. The PVA made no attempt to follow the Rangers and Company I platoon as they withdrew piecemeal from their high ground positions to join the remainder of Company I on the beach. Bothered only by sporadic fire, the two companies waited for darkness before shuttling forces to the south shore of the reservoir. Completing the return trip after midnight, they moved on to join the remainder of the regiment, which Harris had pulled back to the Kansas Line after ordering the evacuation of the eastern peninsula.

As Harris began pulling his forces off the peninsula, Hoge decided to forego any further separate action against the dam and authorized the relief of the 7th Cavalry by the 1st Korean Marine Corps Regiment on 12 April. Hoge attributed the 7th Cavalry's failure to reach the dam principally to the loss of surprise. Sharing the cause were hasty planning; shortages of equipment, particularly amphibious gear; and lack of normal direct support artillery fire. Certainly the canalized terrain and the strength and fortified position of the defending forces also contributed. In any case, since Ridgway meanwhile had ordered the opening of Operation Dauntless, Hoge elected to wait until then, when the dam would be an objective of a full IX Corps' advance to the Wyoming Line. The decision would not prove a great gamble. Although the PVA had closed some of the sluice gates late on 10 April, they would not attempt to flood the Pukhan during the course of Operation Dauntless.

== Aftermath ==
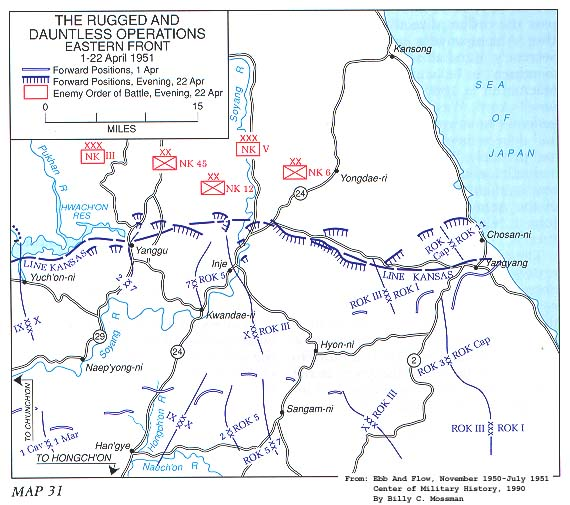
Operations Rugged and Dauntless eastern front map

Ridgway set an opening date for Operation Dauntless late on 9 April, after all but X and ROKA III Corps had reached the Kansas Line. While those two Corps continued what had proved a battle more with terrain than with the enemy, I and IX Corps forces were to start toward the Iron Triangle on the 11th. Utah, the initial objective line, arched 11 miles (18 km) above Kansas between the Imjin River and the eastern slopes of Kungmang Mountain, its trace resting on the prominent Kumhak, Kwangdok and Paegun mountain masses. The opening phase thus would be primarily an I Corps operation involving attacks by the 3rd, 24th and 25th Divisions while requiring only a short advance by the British 27th Brigade at the left of IX Corps.

== See also ==
- Operation Courageous
- Operation Dauntless
