= Gwangdeoksan =

Gwangdeoksan may refer to:

- Gwangdeoksan (Gangwon/Gyeonggi), a mountain in South Korea
- Gwangdeoksan (South Chungcheong), a mountain in South Korea
