= Gwangdeoksan (South Chungcheong) =

Mountain in South Korea

Highest point
- Elevation: 699 m (2,293 ft)

Geography
- Location: South Chungcheong Province, South Korea

Gwangdeoksan is a mountain of South Chungcheong Province, western South Korea. It has an elevation of 699 metres.

== See also ==
- List of mountains of Korea
