= Baegunsan (Gangwon and Gyeonggi) =

Mountain in South Korea

Mt. Baegun

Highest point
- Elevation: 904.4 m (2,967 ft)
- Listing: Mountains of Korea
- Coordinates: 38°04′29″N 127°26′39″E

Geography
- Country: South Korea
- Provinces: Gyeonggi, Gangwon

Korean name
- Hangul: 백운산
- Hanja: 白雲山
- RR: Baegunsan
- MR: Paegunsan

Baegunsan (Korean: 백운산) or Mount Baegun is a mountain in South Korea. Its area extends across Pocheon, Gyeonggi Province and into Hwacheon County, Gangwon Province. Baegunsan has an elevation of 904.4 m (2,967 ft).
