= Geumhaksan =

Mountain in Cheorwon, South Korea

Highest point
- Elevation: 947 m (3,107 ft)

Geography
- Location: South Korea

Korean name
- Hangul: 금학산
- Hanja: 金鶴山
- RR: Geumhaksan
- MR: Kŭmhaksan

Geumhaksan (Korean: 금학산) is a mountain in Cheorwon County, Gangwon Province, South Korea. It has an elevation of 947 m (3,107 ft).

== See also ==
- List of mountains in Korea
