= Gwangdeoksan (Gangwon and Gyeonggi) =

Mountain in South Korea

Highest point
- Elevation: 1,046 m (3,432 ft)
- Coordinates: 38.115°N 127.431°E

Geography
- Location: South Korea

Korean name
- Hangul: 광덕산
- Hanja: 廣德山
- RR: Gwangdeoksan
- MR: Kwangdŏksan

Gwangdeoksan (Korean: 광덕산) is a mountain on the boundary between Gangwon Province and Gyeonggi Province in South Korea. Its area extends across Pocheon and the counties of Hwacheon and Cheorwon. Gwangdeoksan has an elevation of 1,046 m (3,432 ft).

== See also ==
- List of mountains in Korea
