= Ryesong River =

River in North Korea

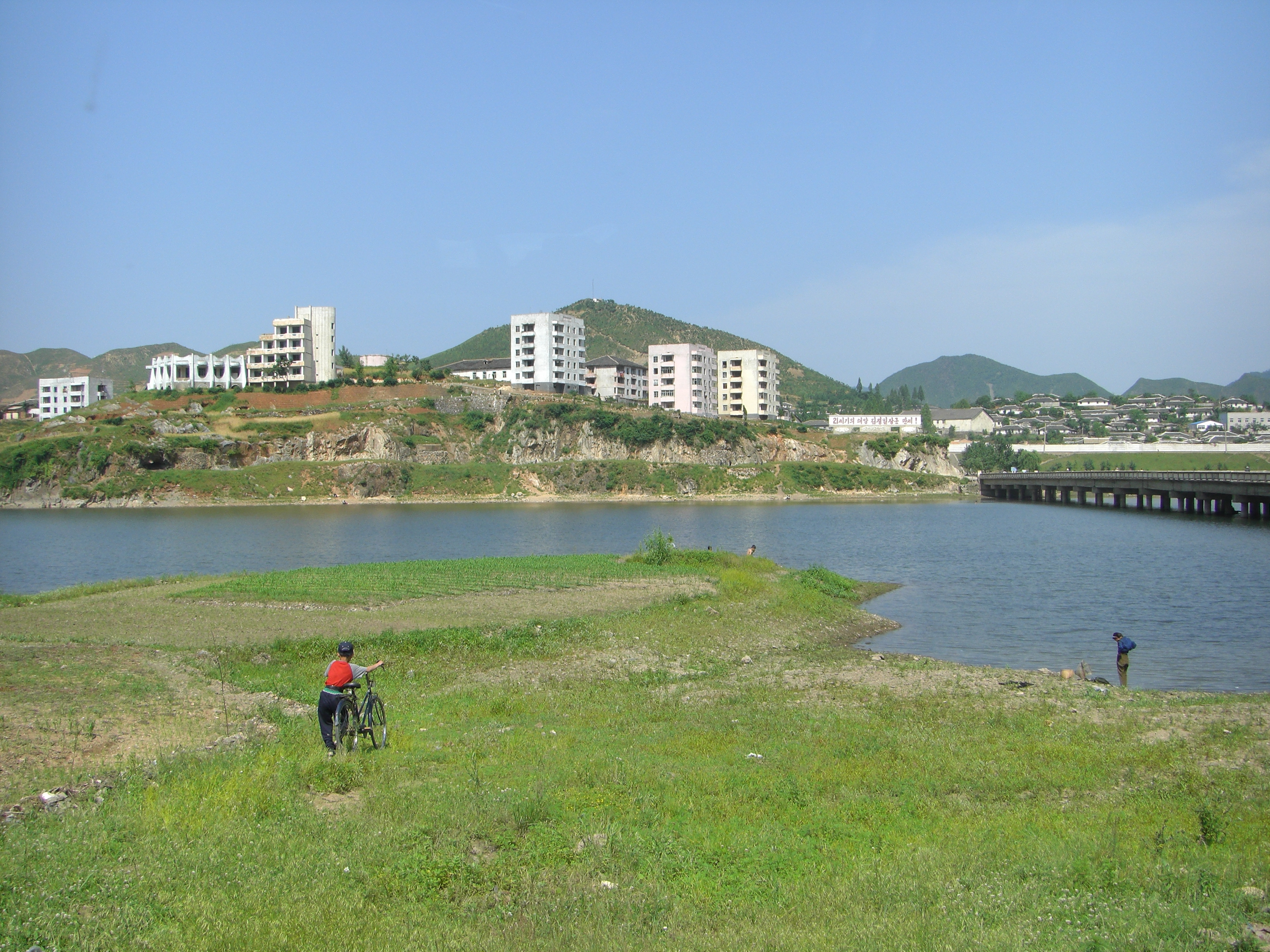
- The Ryesong River flowing through Kumchon, North Hwanghae.
- Native name: 례성강 (Korean)

Location
- Country: North Korea

Physical characteristics
- Source
  - location: Mt. Eonjin
- Mouth: Yellow Sea
  - location: Ganghwa Bay
  - coordinates: 37°53′02″N 126°23′36″E
- Length: 174 kilometers (108 mi)
- Basin size: 4,048 km^{2} (1,563 sq mi)

- North Korean name
- Hangul: 례성강
- Hanja: 禮成江
- RR: Ryeseonggang
- MR: Ryesŏnggang

South Korean name
- Hangul: 예성강
- Hanja: 禮成江
- RR: Yeseonggang
- MR: Yesŏnggang

The Ryesŏng River is a river of North Korea. It flows from north to south, emptying into the Yellow Sea by Ganghwa Island, just west of the mouth of the River Imjin.

== See also ==
- Rivers of Korea
