= 8th Field Artillery Regiment =

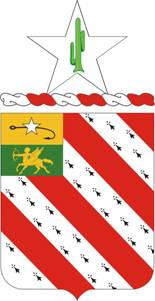
- Coat of arms
- Active: 1916
- Country: (United States)
- Branch: United States Army
- Type: Field artillery
- Role: USARS parent regiment
- Size: regiment
- Nickname: Automatic 8th
- Mottos: AUDACIEUX ET TENACE (Daring and Tenacious).

Commanders
- Notable commanders: General Peyton C. March, 1916

Insignia
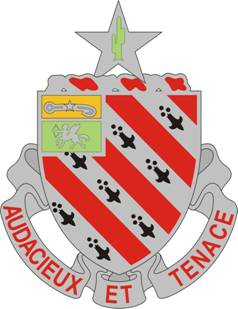
- Distinctive unit insignia

The 8th Field Artillery Regiment is a field artillery regiment of the United States Army first formed in 1916. The regiment served in World War I, World War II, and Korea, and regimental units have served in Vietnam, Honduras, Panama, Operation Desert Storm, Operation Enduring Freedom and Operation Iraqi Freedom. Currently organized as a parent regiment under the U.S. Army Regimental System, the regiment's only active component is the 2nd Battalion, 8th Field Artillery Regiment, currently assigned to the 1st Infantry Brigade Combat Team, 11th Airborne Division and stationed at Fort Wainwright, Alaska.

== Current status of regimental elements ==
- 1st Battalion, 8th Field Artillery Regiment- Inactive since 15 September 1997.
- 2nd Battalion, 8th Field Artillery Regiment- Active, assigned to the 1st Infantry Brigade, 11th Airborne Division.
- 3rd Battalion, 8th Field Artillery Regiment- Inactive since 15 January 1996.
- 4th Battalion, 8th Field Artillery Regiment- Inactive since 15 September 1991.
- 5th Battalion, 8th Field Artillery Regiment- Inactive since 16 May 1996.
- 6th Battalion, 8th Field Artillery Regiment- Inactive since 15 September 1993.
- 7th Battalion, 8th Field Artillery Regiment- Inactive since 15 July 1995.
- 8th Battalion, 8th Field Artillery Regiment- Inactive since 25 May 1996.

== History ==
The 8th Field Artillery Regiment was first activated in 1916 from elements of the 5th, and 6th Field Artillery.

The regiment fought in World War I as part of the 7th Division. After the war, the regiment was stationed in Hawaii, and assigned to the Hawaiian Division.

As part of the Army's reorganization in "triangular" infantry divisions in 1941, the regiment was reorganized and redesignated as the 8th Field Artillery Battalion, and reassigned to the 25th Infantry Division. The 8th Field Artillery Battalion fought in World War II and Korea with the 25th, earning 14 campaign streamers and seven unit awards.

As part of the reorganization into pentomic divisions, the 8th Field Artillery Battalion was relieved from the 25th Infantry Division, reorganized and redesignated as the 8th Artillery, and assigned to the Department of the Army as a parent regiment under the Combat Arms Regimental System and, after 1981, under the U.S. Army Regimental System.

== Further service by regimental elements ==
The 1st Battalion, 8th Field Artillery Regiment was assigned to the 25th Infantry Division Artillery from 1957 – 1986, and served in Vietnam, earning 12 campaign streamers and four unit awards. From 1986 – 1997, the battalion remained attached to the 25th Infantry Division as a separate battalion.

The 2nd Battalion, 8th Field Artillery Regiment served with the 7th Infantry Division (United States) in Korea from 1957 – 1971, and at Fort Ord, California and Fort Lewis, Washington from 1975 – 1995. Reassigned to the 25th Infantry Division, and later to the 1st Brigade Combat Team, 25th Infantry Division at both Fort Lewis, Washington and Fort Wainwright, Alaska, the battalion has deployed multiple times in the Global War on Terrorism.

The 3rd Battalion, 8th Field Artillery Regiment served as a reserve unit in the 81st Infantry Division at Macon, Georgia from 1959 – 1965. Activated in the Regular Army from 1983 – 1996, the battalion deployed to Operations Desert Shield and Desert Storm with the 18th Field Artillery Brigade.

The 4th Battalion, 8th Field Artillery Regiment served as a separate reserve unit in Pittsburgh and Clearfield, Pennsylvania from 1959 – 1976, and then with the 157th Infantry Brigade until inactivation in 1991.

The 5th Battalion, 8th Field Artillery Regiment served as reserve unit with the 103rd Infantry Division at Milwaukee, Wisconsin, from 1959 – 1963. Reactivated in the Regular Army from 1983 – 1996, the battalion deployed to Operations Desert Shield and Desert Storm with the 18th Field Artillery Brigade.

The 6th Battalion, 8th Field Artillery Regiment served at Fort Sill, Oklahoma, and in Korea from 1959 – 1963, and at Fort Carson, Colorado from 1967 – 1970. The battalion was assigned to the 7th Infantry Division (Light) at Fort Ord, California, from 1983 – 1993, including deployment to Honduras during Operation Golden Pheasant and Panama during Operation Just Cause.

The 7th Battalion, 8th Field Artillery Regiment returned to active duty from 1962 – 1971, and served in Vietnam, earning 11 campaign streamers. It returned to active duty again from 1983 – 1995, serving with the 25th Infantry Division (Light) at Schofield Barracks, Hawaii.

The 8th Battalion, 8th Field Artillery Regiment served in Korea with the 2nd Infantry Division Artillery from 1983 – 1996.

== Lineage and honors ==
=== Lineage ===
- Constituted 1 July 1916 in the Regular Army as the 8th Field Artillery
- Organized 7 July 1916 at Fort Bliss, Texas
- Assigned 6 December 1917 to the 7th Division
- Relieved 1 March 1921 from assignment to the 7th Division and assigned to the Hawaiian Division
- Reorganized and redesignated 1 October 1941 as the 8th Field Artillery Battalion; concurrently, relieved from assignment to the Hawaiian Division and assigned to the 25th Infantry Division
- Relieved 1 February 1957 from assignment to the 25th Infantry Division; concurrently reorganized and redesignated as the 8th Artillery, a parent regiment under the Combat Arms Regimental System
- Redesignated 1 September 1971 as the 8th Field Artillery
- Withdrawn 1 October 1983 from the Combat Arms Regimental System and reorganized under the United States Army Regimental System

=== Campaign participation credit ===
- World War I: Streamer without inscription
- World War II: Central Pacific; Guadalcanal; Luzon
- Korean War: UN Defensive; UN Offensive; CCF intervention; First UN Counteroffensive; CCF Spring Offensive; UN Summer–Fall Offensive; Second Korean Winter; Korea, Summer–Fall 1952; Third Korean Winter; Korea, Summer 1953
- Vietnam: Counteroffensive; Counteroffensive, Phase II; Counteroffensive, Phase III; Tet Counteroffensive; Counteroffensive, Phase IV; Counteroffensive, Phase V; Counteroffensive, Phase VI; Tet 69/Counteroffensive; Summer–Fall 1969; Winter–Spring 1970; Sanctuary Counteroffensive; Counteroffensive, Phase VII; Consolidation I
- Armed Forces Expeditions: Panama
- Southwest Asia: Defense of Saudi Arabia; Liberation and Defense of Kuwait
- War on Terror:

- Afghanistan: Consolidation II; Consolidation III
- Iraq: Iraqi Governance; Iraqi Surge

=== Decorations ===
- Presidential Unit Citation (Army), Streamer embroidered TAEGU (8th Field artillery Battalion [less Battery C] cited; da GO 49, 1951)
- Presidential Unit Citation (Army), Streamer embroidered SANGNYONG-Ni (8th Field artillery Battalion [less Battery C] cited; da GO 72, 1951)
- Presidential Unit Citation (Navy), Streamer embroidered WONJU-HWACHON (8th Field artillery Battalion cited; da GO 38, 1957)
- Valorous Unit award, Streamer embroidered CU CHI DISTRICT (1st Battalion, 8th artillery, cited; da GO 20, 1967)
- Meritorious Unit Commendation (Army), Streamer embroidered VIETNAM 1967–1968 (7th Battalion, 8th artillery, cited; da GO 17, 1969)
- Meritorious Unit Commendation (Army), Streamer embroidered VIETNAM 1968–1969 (7th Battalion, 8th artillery, cited; da GO 39, 1970)
- Navy Unit Commendation, Streamer embroidered PANMUNJOM (8th Field artillery Battalion cited; da GO 38, 1957)
- Philippine Presidential Unit Citation, Streamer embroidered 17 OCTOBER 1944 TO 4 JULY 1945 (25th infantry division cited; da GO 47, 1950)
- Republic of Korea Presidential Unit Citation, Streamer embroidered MASAN–CHINJU (8th Field artillery Battalion cited; da GO 35, 1951)
- Republic of Korea Presidential Unit Citation, Streamer embroidered MUNSAN-NI (8th Field artillery Battalion cited; da GO 19, 1955)

== Heraldry ==
=== Distinctive unit insignia ===
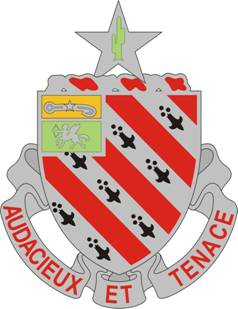

- Description

A silver color metal and enamel device 1 5/32 inches (2.9 cm) in height overall consisting of the shield, crest and motto of the coat of arms.

- Symbolism

This regiment was organized in 1916 at Fort Bliss, Texas, from the 5th and 6th Regiments of Field Artillery. Its birthplace and initial service on the Mexican border are shown on the crest, the lone star of Texas and the cactus. The regiment was in the 7th Division and was in training in Brittany shown by the ermine taken from the arms of that province. The numerical designation of the regiment is indicated by the eight divisions of the shield. The parent organizations are shown on the canton. The fishhook and star are from the arms of the 5th Field Artillery and represent that regiment's service in the 12th Corps at Gettysburg. The winged centaur is the crest of the 6th Field Artillery. Both the 5th and 6th saw service in Mexico in 1846-1847 as indicated by the color green. The motto is also a combination of those of the 5th and 6th Field Artillery Regiments.

- Background

The distinctive unit insignia was originally approved for the 8th Field Artillery Regiment on 19 January 1923. It was amended to correct the description on 6 December 1923. It was redesignated for the 8th Field Artillery Battalion on 8 April 1942. The insignia was redesignated for the 8th Artillery Regiment on 28 August 1957. It was redesignated for the 8th Field Artillery Regiment on 1 September 1971.

=== Coat of arms ===
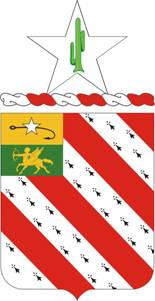

- Blazon
  - Shield: Bendy of eight ermine and Gules, on a canton per fess Or and Vert a fishhook eye to dexter barb to base Sable debruised by a mullet Argent fimbriated of the last and a winged centaur courant armed with a bow and arrow of the third.
  - Crest: On a wreath of the colors Argent and Gules a mullet of the first charged with a giant cactus Vert.
- Symbolism
  - Shield: The regiment was in the 7th Division and was in training in Brittany shown by the ermine taken from the arms of that province. The numerical designation of the regiment is indicated by the eight divisions of the shield. The parent organizations are shown on the canton. The fishhook and star are from the arms of the 5th Field Artillery and represent that regiment's service in the 12th Corps at Gettysburg. The winged centaur is the crest of the 6th Field Artillery. Both the 5th and 6th saw service in Mexico in 1846-1847 as indicated by the color green.
  - Crest: This regiment was organized in 1916 at Fort Bliss, Texas, from the 5th and 6th Regiments of Field Artillery. Its birthplace and initial service on the Mexican border are shown on the crest, the lone star of Texas and the cactus.
  - Motto: The motto is also a combination of those of the 5th and 6th Field Artillery Regiments.
- Background: The coat of arms was originally approved for the 8th Field Artillery Regiment on 14 June 1920. It was amended to correct the blazon on 11 October 1921. It was redesignated for the 8th Field Artillery Battalion on 7 April 1942. The insignia was redesignated for the 8th Artillery Regiment on 28 August 1957. It was redesignated for the 8th Field Artillery Regiment on 1 September 1971.
