= Robert B. McClure =

United States Army general

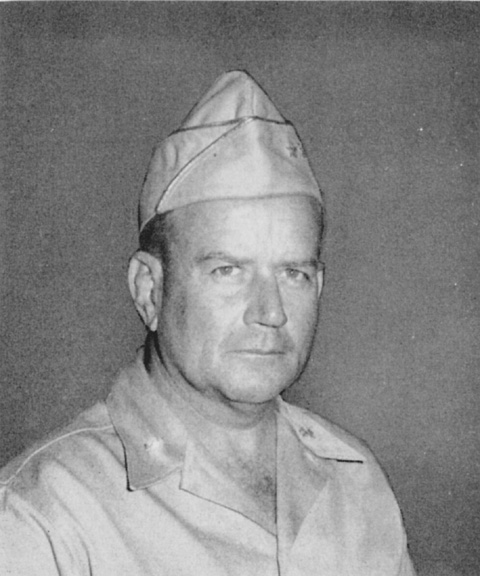
- Born: September 15, 1896; Rome, Georgia, United States
- Died: September 15, 1973 (aged 77)
- Burial place: Arlington National Cemetery, Virginia, United States
- Military career
- Allegiance: United States
- Branch: United States Army
- Service years: 1917–1954
- Rank: Major General
- Service number: 0-6785
- Unit: Infantry Branch
- Commands: 35th Infantry Regiment; 84th Infantry Division; Americal Division; Chinese Combat Command; 2nd Infantry Division; 6th Infantry Division
- Conflicts: World War I; Meuse–Argonne offensive; Chinese Civil War; World War II; Guadalcanal campaign; Operation Cartwheel; New Georgia campaign; Capture of Vella Lavella; Bougainville campaign; Second Sino-Japanese War; Chinese Civil War; Operation Beleaguer; Korean War; Battle for Wonju
- Awards: Distinguished Service Cross; Army Distinguished Service Medal (3)

Major General Robert Battey McClure (September 15, 1896 – September 15, 1973) was a senior United States Army officer who served in World War I, World War II, and the Korean War.

Born in 1896, McClure joined the United States Army in 1917. He served on the Western Front during World War I and was awarded the Distinguished Service Cross. He remained in the army after the war, and served in China with the 15th Infantry Regiment. He served as a regimental commander during the Guadalcanal and New Georgia campaigns of World War II. He later commanded the "Americal" Division during the Bougainville Campaign. During the Korean War he replaced Laurence B. Keiser as commander of 2nd Infantry Division but was relieved of his command after only a month due to the division's poor performance during the battle for Wonju. He retired from the army in 1954 and died in 1973 at the age of 77.

== Early life and military career ==
McClure was born on September 15, 1896, in Rome, Georgia, and graduated from New York Military Academy as Cadet First Captain in 1915. Entering the United States Naval Academy in 1916, he was unable to maintain the academic achievements necessary to remain in the academy. He subsequently enlisted in the United States Army.

After the American entry into World War I, McClure was commissioned as a second lieutenant into the Infantry Branch. He fought on the Western Front with the 102nd Infantry Regiment, part of the 26th Division of the American Expeditionary Force (AEF). He was awarded the Distinguished Service Cross for his actions at Bellieu Bois during the Meuse–Argonne offensive on October 27, 1918, where he was wounded. The citation for the medal reads:

For extraordinary heroism in action at Bellieu Bois, France, 27 October 1918. After being wounded Lieutenant McClure continued to lead his men until he was again wounded by enemy machine-gun fire in the foot and knee. Despite his wounds he reorganized his command and established a line of resistance, retaining active command until relieved by another officer several hours later.

== Interbellum ==
Remaining in the army following the end of the war, McClure spent from 1927 to 1933 in Tianjin, China with the 15th Infantry Regiment, becoming fluent in Chinese. One of his fellow officers was Albert Coady Wedemeyer, under whom he would serve during the latter stages of World War II. He entered the U.S. Army War College in 1938, where he made the acquaintance of Major J. Lawton Collins, an instructor at the college at the time. After graduation, McClure then spent time on the staff of the 25th Infantry Division as divisional G-4 (handling logistics and supply).

== World War II ==
When Collins was made commander of the 25th Infantry Division in 1942, shortly after the Japanese attack on Pearl Harbor on December 7, 1941, and the subsequent German declaration of war on the United States four days later, he made McClure commander of one of the division's three infantry regiments, the 35th.

McClure led the regiment during the Guadalcanal and New Georgia campaigns, as well as during the capture of Vella Lavella.

Having spent time as aide-de-camp to Collins, in 1943 he returned to the United States with the two-star general officer rank of major general, and put in command of his own division, the 84th Infantry Division, succeeding Major General Stonewall Jackson, who has been killed in an air crash. After six months preparing the division for combat in the European Theater of Operations, he returned to the Solomon Islands as commander of the 23rd "Americal" Infantry Division, which was then participating in the Bougainville campaign.

In November 1944, McClure returned to China to act as chief of staff to Albert Coady Wedemeyer, his former comrade from the 15th Infantry Regiment. Wedemeyer had replaced General Joe Stilwell as commander of United States forces in China. Shortly after his arrival in China, McClure was sent into the field and made commander of Chinese Combat Command, remaining in this capacity until the end of the war in 1945. He was twice awarded the Army Distinguished Service Medal for his services during the war.

In the immediate postwar period he remained in China training Kuomintang guerillas before being transferred to a post on the Marianas Islands.

== Korean War ==
In December 1950, during the Korean War, the commander of the 2nd Infantry Division, Major General Laurence B. Keiser was sacked for the division's performance during the Battle of the Ch'ongch'on River, although his dismissal was dressed up as being for medical reasons. McClure was named by Collins, now the Chief of Staff of the United States Army and a full general, as his replacement, although his tenure as divisional commander would turn out to be short-lived.

The division, previously part of IX Corps, was redeployed to X Corps and now came under the jurisdiction of Major General Edward Almond, the corps commander. Almond began to be critical of McClure's leadership, citing a "lack of supervision" in reports back to Lieutenant General Matthew Ridgway, then commanding the Eighth Army. After a period of refitting, the division was ordered to Wonju, which had been deemed by Ridgway to be "second only to Seoul" in tactical importance. During the battle for Wonju, McClure found his position to be increasingly indefensible especially when flanking South Korean troops were overrun by the North Korean People's Army. He ordered his division to withdraw to a position much farther to the rear than agreed upon by Almond, who was angered by McClure's disobedience. After little more than a month as divisional commander, McClure was relieved of his command on the grounds of "poor leadership". He was replaced as commander of the division by Major General Clark L. Ruffner, in a move endorsed by Ridgeway.

== Later life ==
Following his dismissal, McClure commanded the 6th Infantry Division, which was then based at Fort Ord in California. McClure retired from the army in 1954, after 37 years service. In 1956, he was awarded his third Distinguished Service Medal for services during the Cold War. He died on September 15, 1973, on his 77th birthday, and is buried at Arlington National Cemetery, in Virginia.

== Notes ==
Military offices
Preceded by Stonewall Jackson	Commanding General 84th Infantry Division; 1943–1944	Succeeded by Roscoe B. Woodruff
Preceded by John R. Hodge	Commanding General Americal Division; April–October 1944	Succeeded by William Howard Arnold
Preceded by Laurence B. Keiser	Commanding General 2nd Infantry Division; 1950–1951	Succeeded by Clark L. Ruffner
Preceded by Robert T. Frederick	Commanding General 6th Infantry Division; 1951–1954	Succeeded by Edwin K. Wright
