= Stonewall Jackson (20th century general) =

U.S. Army general

- Born: March 4, 1891; Arlington, Kentucky, US
- Died: October 13, 1943 (aged 52); Camp Polk, Louisiana, US
- Burial place: Arlington National Cemetery
- Spouse: Dorothy F. Jackson (1897–1970)
- Military career
- Allegiance: United States
- Service years: 1917–1943
- Rank: Major general
- Commands: 84th Infantry Division
- Conflicts: World War II

Stonewall Jackson (March 4, 1891 – October 13, 1943) was an American major general during World War II. He died while on active duty commanding the 84th Infantry Division near Camp Howze, Texas.

Although it is believed that he was named after Confederate Lieutenant General Thomas Jonathan "Stonewall" Jackson, it is not believed he is related to him. However, his father, Samuel Warren Jackson (1841–1923), was a cavalryman in the 3rd Texas Cavalry Regiment during the American Civil War.

The younger Jackson served in the Army of Occupation after the First World War. He later served as professor of military science and tactics at Georgetown University, and taught at Cornell. Jackson was made commander of the 84th Infantry Division in February 1943, and was promoted to major general on March 15, 1943.

Jackson died on October 13, 1943, at the Camp Polk Station Hospital as a result of injuries received in a plane crash on October 4, 1943. He was one of the highest-ranking American generals to die in the United States during World War II along with General Malin Craig, Major General Herbert Dargue, Major General Frank C. Mahin, Major General Robert Olds, Major General Paul Newgarden, and Major General William H. Rupertus.

Military offices
Preceded by John H. Hilldring	Commanding General 84th Infantry Division; February 1943 – October 1943	Succeeded by Robert B. McClure
