= Laurence B. Keiser =

American general

Laurence Bolton Keiser
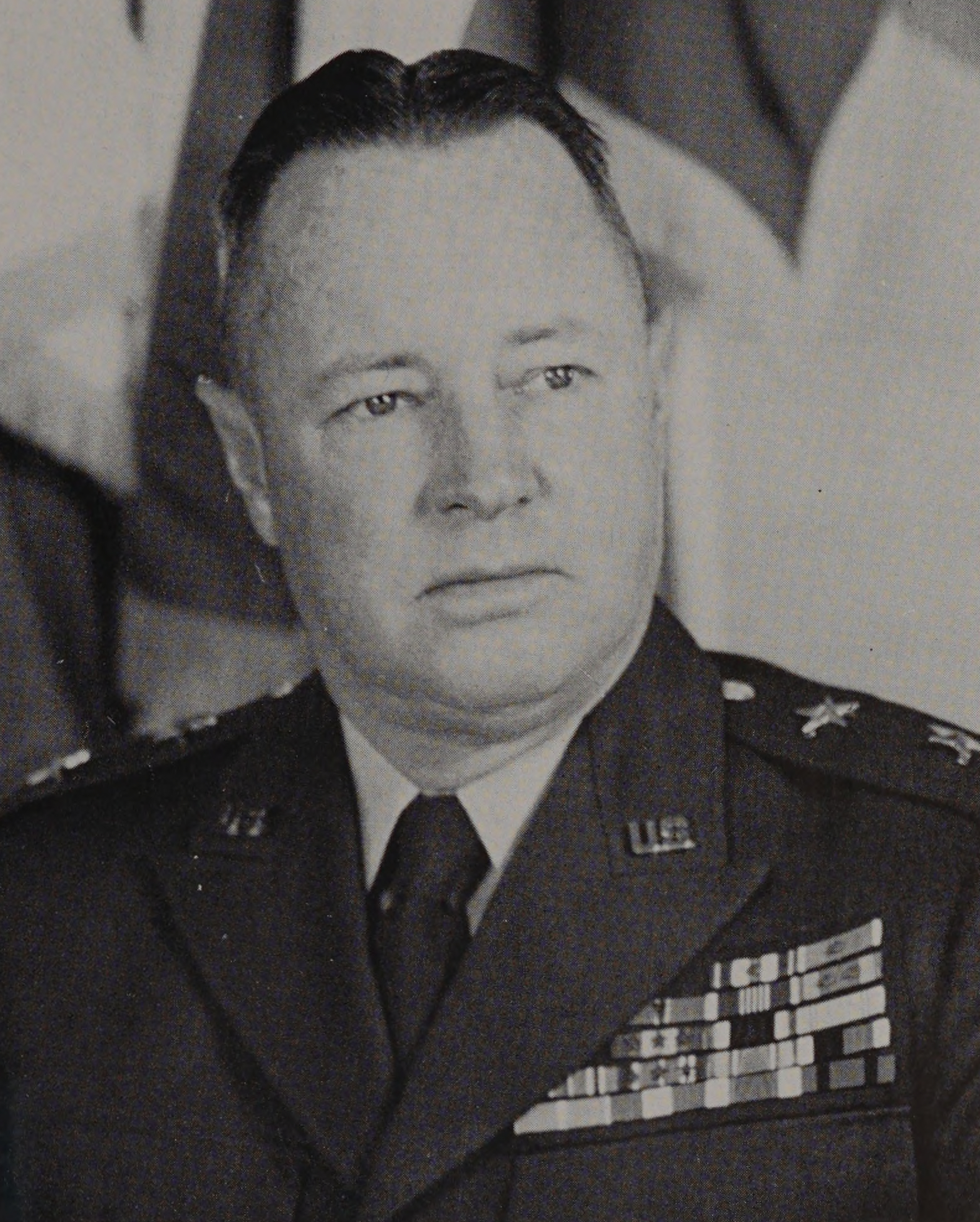
- Keiser as 5th Infantry Division commander c. 1952
- Born: June 1, 1895; Philadelphia, Pennsylvania, United States
- Died: October 20, 1969 (aged 74); San Francisco, California, United States
- Burial place: United States Military Academy Post Cemetery, West Point, New York, United States
- Military career
- Allegiance: United States of America
- Branch: United States Army
- Service years: 1917 - 1953
- Rank: Major General
- Nickname: "Dutch"
- Commands: 2nd Infantry Division
- Conflicts: World War I: Western Front; World War II: North African campaign; Italian campaign; Korean War: Great Naktong Offensive; Battle of the Ch'ongch'on River
- Awards: Silver Star; Legion of Merit (2)

Major General Laurence B. "Dutch" Keiser (June 1, 1895 – October 20, 1969) was an American officer who served in both World War I and World War II. During the early stages of the Korean War, he commanded the 2nd Infantry Division.

== Early life ==
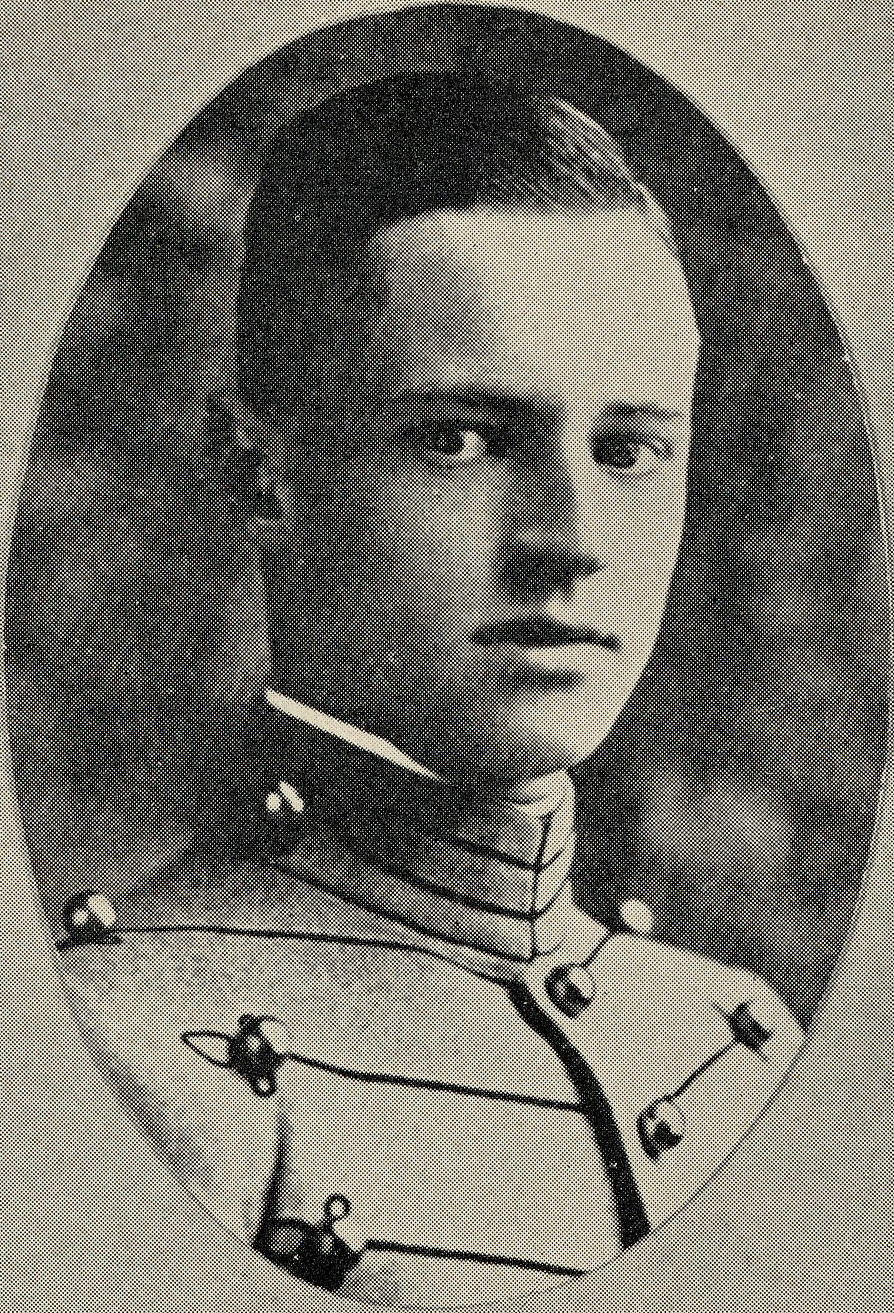
Keiser as a United States Military Academy cadet c. 1917

Laurence Bolton Keiser was born in Philadelphia, Pennsylvania, on June 1, 1895. He graduated from West Point in April 1917, 118th in a graduating class of 139, in the same class as J. Lawton Collins, Matthew Ridgway, and Mark W. Clark, two weeks after the American entry into World War I.

== Military career ==
Dispatched to France with the American Expeditionary Force during World War I, Keiser was quickly promoted to temporary captain and appointed to command of 1st Battalion, 6th Infantry Regiment, a unit of the 5th Division. He was awarded the Silver Star for actions on the Western Front.

== Interwar period ==
Keiser was stationed with the 15th Infantry Regiment in Tientsin, China from March 1920 to June 1922. In 1923 he graduated from the Infantry Company Officers’ Course at Fort Benning. He then served as a battalion commander in the 23rd Infantry Regiment at Fort Sam Houston. From 1924 to 1928, Keiser was an instructor at West Point.

After his assignment at West Point, Keiser returned to Fort Sam Houston as the commander of a company in the 9th Infantry. In 1932 he completed the Infantry Officer Advanced Course at Fort Benning, after which he returned to Fort Sam Houston as advisor and mentor to units of the Army Reserve.

In 1939 Keiser graduated from the United States Army Command and General Staff College, after which he was assigned to Fort Benning as executive officer and then commander of the 29th Infantry Regiment.

== World War II ==
In April 1942, Keiser was assigned as chief of staff of III Corps at Fort McPherson. He then served as VI Corps chief of staff during the North African and Italian Campaigns. In January 1944, he was promoted to brigadier general and assigned as chief of staff of the Fourth Army at Fort Sam Houston. He returned to China in 1948, this time as part of the United States Military Advisory Group to the Nationalist Chinese Government.

== Korean War ==
In November 1948, Keiser was made assistant division commander of the 2nd Infantry Division. In February 1950, his former West Point classmate Joe Collins gave him command of the division, together with a promotion to major general. Following the outbreak of the Korean War, the 2nd Division was the first United States army unit to arrive in Korea from the mainland United States.

From August to September, the division disembarked at Pusan and moved to the Naktong Bulge to assist the 24th Infantry Division, which was then struggling to restore its front line following the crossing of the Naktong River by the North Korean 4th Division.

When the North Koreans launched the Great Naktong Offensive, four divisions faced the 2nd. Some units of the 2nd Infantry Division did not perform well on first contact with the enemy, and Keiser displayed lack of knowledge of his division's situation when he was confronted by Lieutenant General Walton Walker, the commander of the Eighth Army. Keiser was already considered by some officers to be slightly too old for an outstanding division commander.

The 2nd Division was involved in the breakout from the Pusan Perimeter, pushing northwest towards Kunsan, together with the 25th Infantry Division. The division would advance well into North Korea, close to the China–North Korea border.

In late November 1950, a large Chinese force crossed over the Yalu River and launched a surprise attack on the United Nations forces in what was to be known as the Battle of the Ch'ongch'on River. The 2nd Division had been advancing on the right flank of IX Corps, which was then pushing to the Yalu River, and was positioned north of Kunu-ri, with the 25th Infantry Division on its left flank. In a swift week-long attack, the Chinese threatened to envelop the Eighth Army, with the 2nd Division exposed on the right and bearing the brunt of the enveloping movement. The 25th Division was able to withdraw to Anju, but Keiser was unable to obtain permission from Major General John B. Coulter to follow. The 2nd Division was eventually cut off and forced to fight its way through the Chinese to safety at Sunchon.

Following the Battle of the Ch'ongch'on River, during which 2nd Division suffered crippling losses of approximately 6,000 men, Keiser met with Major General Leven Cooper Allen, the chief of staff of the Eighth Army, in Seoul. He was relieved of his command and replaced with Major General Robert B. McClure, supposedly for medical reasons, although he felt he was being made a scapegoat for the reverses suffered by the United Nations following the Chinese intervention in the war.

== Later life ==
Returning to the United States in February 1951, he assumed command of the 5th Infantry Division at Indiantown Gap Military Reservation (IGMR) an infantry basic training camp in Pennsylvania near Hershey and Harrisburg. He retired in 1953 and settled in San Francisco. On October 20, 1969, Keiser died in San Francisco.

== Bibliography ==
- Blair, Clay (1987). The Forgotten War: America in Korea, 1950–1953. New York, New York: Times Books. ISBN 0-8129-1670-0.
- Halberstam, David (2007). The Coldest Winter: America and the Korean War. New York, New York: Hyperion. ISBN 978-1-4013-0052-4.
- Korea Institute of Military History (2000). The Korean War. Vol. 1. Lincoln, Nebraska: The University of Nebraska Press. ISBN 978-0-8032-7794-6.
- Stokesbury, James L. (1988). A Short History of the Korean War. New York, New York: William Morrow & Co. ISBN 0-688-09513-5.
- Taaffe, Stephen R. (2016). MacArthur's Korean War Generals. Lawrence, Kansas: University Press of Kansas. ISBN 978-0-7006-2221-4.

Military offices
| Preceded by Harry J. Collins | Commanding General 2nd Infantry Division; April 1950 – December 1950 | Succeeded by Robert B. McClure |
