= Loyal M. Haynes =

United States Army officer (1895–1974)

- Born: 3 March 1895; Iowa, US
- Died: 7 February 1974 (aged 78)
- Military career
- Allegiance: United States
- Branch: United States Army
- Service years: 1917–1954
- Rank: Brigadier General
- Service number: 0-8379
- Unit: Field Artillery Branch
- Commands: 2nd Infantry Division Artillery
- Conflicts: World War I World War II; Korean War
- Awards: Soldier's Medal; Army Distinguished Service Medal; Silver Star

Loyal Moyer Haynes (3 March 1895 – 7 February 1974) was a brigadier general in the United States Army who commanded the 2nd Infantry Division Artillery during the Korean War.

== Early life and education ==
Haynes was a native of Le Mars, Iowa. Before the outbreak of World War I, he attended Knox College, where he was a member of Tau Kappa Epsilon fraternity.

== Career ==
=== World War I ===
In August 1917, Haynes was commissioned as a Second lieutenant of Artillery in the United States Army.

=== Interwar Period ===
In 1932, Haynes was one of the first United States Army officers to be awarded the Soldier's Medal.

=== World War II ===
Haynes was awarded a Distinguished Service Medal for his exploits during World War II. After the conclusion of the War, Haynes served as the head of the advisory board of U.S. forces in Austria. Haynes was a passenger in the 1946 C-53 Skytrooper crash on the Gauli Glacier but survived with only a broken nose.

=== Korean War ===
During the Korean War, General Haynes commanded an artillery task force during The Great Naktong Offensive. In November 1950, General Haynes was awarded a Silver Star for gallantry in action as Commanding General of the 2nd Infantry Division Artillery (United States), against an armed enemy from 31 August 1950 to 15 September 1950 in the Naktong River Salient. During this period a numerically superior enemy force forced the front lines of the Division back to a point 700 yards from General Haynes’ Command Post, thereby breaching the American lines for about 7,000 yards, and threatening the tactical integrity of the entire Division. Although communications were practically non-existent, General Haynes assumed command of the infantry and armored elements in his sector and, having evaluated the enemy dispositions, ordered an immediate counterattack. He then reestablished communications between his Command Post north of Changyong and the elements of the Division south of Yongsan, although the area between was in enemy hands. Skillfully coordinating the efforts of the two infantry regiments in his zone and providing them with heavy artillery fire support, General Haynes then directed the defense of the Northern Sector so that the town of Changnyong, key to the pass leading to the Eighth Army's supply route, was denied to the enemy and the front stabilized.
