= Frank Mahin =

United States Army general (1887–1942)

Frank Cadle Mahin
- Born: Frank C. Mahin; May 27, 1887; Clinton, Iowa
- Died: July 24, 1942 (aged 55); Wayne County, Tennessee
- Burial place: Arlington National Cemetery
- Spouse: Mauree Pickering Mahin
- Children: 4
- Military career
- Allegiance: United States
- Branch: United States Army
- Service years: 1910–1942
- Rank: Major general
- Commands: 33rd Infantry Division
- Conflicts: World War II
- Awards: Purple Heart

Frank Cadle Mahin (May 27, 1887 – July 24, 1942) was an American Major General during the period of World War II. He died in an airplane crash while on active duty commanding the 33rd Division. Mahin was one of the highest-ranked American generals to die in the United States during World War II along with General Malin Craig, Major General Herbert Dargue, Major General Robert Olds, Major General Paul Newgarden, Major General William H. Rupertus, and Major General Stonewall Jackson.

Mahin was partially educated in England. He graduated from Harvard University in 1909. Brigadier General Theodore Roosevelt Jr. was another general from the 1909 Harvard graduating class who died during World War II.

Mahin was buried at Arlington National Cemetery. His son Colonel Frank C. Mahin Jr. (1923–1972) was buried with him. His wife Mauree Pickering Mahin died on May 27, 1985, at age 94 and is also buried at Arlington National Cemetery.

Military offices
Preceded by Samuel T. Lawton	Commanding General 33rd Infantry Division; May 1942 – July 1942	Succeeded by John Millikin
