= 2nd Battalion, 8th Field Artillery Regiment =

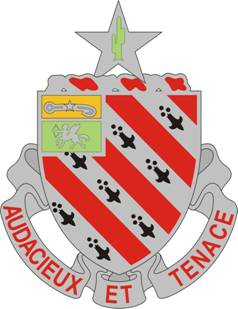
- 8th FA distinctive unit insignia
- Active: 1916-1957; 1957-1971; 1975–present
- Country: United States
- Branch: United States Army
- Type: Field artillery
- Role: Infantry BCT Artillery Battalion
- Size: Battalion
- Part of: 1st Infantry BCT, 11th Airborne Division
- Garrison/HQ: Fort Wainwright, Alaska
- Motto: "Automatic!"
- Engagements: TAEGU SANGNYONG-NI WONJU-HWACHON PANMUNJOM Philippines Korea (MASAN-CHINJU) Korea (MUNSAN-NI) Korea Iraq (2005) Iraq (2008) Afghanistan (2011) Operation Inherent Resolve (2019)

Commanders
- Current commander: LTC Gabriel C. Dearman
- Command Sergeant Major: CSM Uvalde D. Harris
- Notable commanders: Raymond Odierno; Bradley Becker

The 2nd Battalion, 8th Field Artillery Regiment is the field artillery battalion organic to the 1st Infantry Brigade Combat Team, 11th Airborne Division. Originally organized in 1916, the battalion has seen combat service in World War I, World War II, Korea, and the Global War On Terror. Most recently deploying to Iraq in support of Operation Inherent Resolve. The Automatic Battalion has earned, 14 campaign streamers and at least 8 unit awards. The battalion is currently at Fort Wainwright, Alaska.

== History ==
Constituted 1 July 1916 in the Regular Army as Battery B, 8th Field Artillery. Organized 7 July 1916 at Fort Bliss, Texas. Reorganized and redesignated 1 October 1941 as Battery B, 8th Field Artillery Battalion, an element of the 25th Infantry Division. Inactivated 1 February 1957 in Hawaii and relieved from assignment to the 25th Infantry Division.

Redesignated 1 July 1957 as Headquarters and Headquarters Battery, 2d Howitzer Battalion, 8th Artillery, assigned to the 7th Infantry Division, and activated in Korea. Redesignated 1 July 1963 as the 2d Battalion, 8th Artillery. Inactivated 2 April 1971 at Fort Lewis, Washington

Redesignated 1 September 1971 as the 2d Battalion, 8th Field Artillery. Activated 21 April 1975 at Fort Ord., California. Relieved 16 August 1995. from assignment to the 7th Infantry Division and assigned to the 25th Infantry Division

In December 1989, the 2nd Battalion, 8th Field Artillery turned in their M102 howitzers and became the first unit in the US Army to field the M119. That same month, fire support elements from the battalion deployed to Panama during Operation JUST CAUSE with the 1st Brigade Task Force (DRB-2). The brigade served as part of Task Force ATLANTIC until it re-deployed in February 1991. In April 1993, the 2nd Battalion, 8th Field Artillery moved from Fort Ord, California to Fort Lewis, Washington with the 1st Brigade, 7th Infantry Division, often called the 9th Infantry Regimental Combat Team. On 21 January 1995, the 2nd Battalion, 8th Field Artillery deployed to Guantanamo Bay, Cuba to support humanitarian operations. During deployment the battalion was separated into two teams. Team Alpha, consisting of HHS and A Battery, operated Migrant Camp G. Team Bravo, consisting of B and C Batteries, operated Migrant Camp E. The 2nd Battalion, 8th Field Artillery re-deployed to Fort Lewis on 7 June 1995. On 16 August 1995, the battalion was relieved from assignment to the 7th Infantry Division and assigned to the 25th Infantry Division, as the direct support artillery unit to the 1st Brigade (Lancers).

In 2002, the 2nd Battalion, 8th Field Artillery began its transformation with the 1st Brigade while they transitioned from a "light" BCT to a "Stryker" BCT and became only the second BCT to complete the transformation at the time. In doing so, they became the Army's newest Stryker brigade combat team as the Army was in the midst of a major force restructuring and transformation.

On October 15, 2004, the 2nd Battalion, 8th Field Artillery was again called to duty, this time to participate in Operation Iraqi Freedom III. As a part of the Army's newest Stryker BCT, the 2nd Battalion, 8th Field Artillery relieved the 1st Battalion, 37th FA assuming all security and support duties of the area surrounding Quaryyah in the Multi-National Division North's Area of Operation. The battalion officially unfurled its colors at Forward Operating Base Endurance, in northern Iraq on November 2, 2004. During their year in Iraq, the 2nd Battalion, 8th Field Artillery partnered with the 3rd Battalion, Iraqi Army, and successfully began an Iraqi Army training Program. After a year of stability and security operations, the battalion cased its colors once more and returned to Fort Lewis, Washington. Almost immediately upon the 1st Brigade's return from combat, it was given orders to re-flag and subsequently did so from the 1st Stryker Brigade Combat Team, 25th Infantry Division, to the 2nd Stryker Cavalry Regiment on 6 June 2006. The 2nd Battalion, 8th Field Artillery colors were then cased and shipped to the nation's last frontier.

On 14 December 2006, the battalion's colors were once again unfurled in frigid Fort Wainwright, Alaska, as the 172 Stryker Brigade Combat Team and 4th Battalion, 11th Field Artillery re-flagged and assumed the colors of the 1st Stryker Brigade Combat Team and 2nd Battalion, 8th Field Artillery. After the reset period, the 2nd Battalion, 8th Field Artillery was again called to duty along with the 1st Stryker Brigade and was sent to the Iraqi Province of Diyala as a part of the Multi-National Division North and unfurled its colors in October 2008 at Forward Operating Base Warhorse. After a year-long deployment to Iraq, conducting counterinsurgency and stability and support operations the 2nd Battalion, 8th Field Artillery redeployed to Alaska and unfurled its colors at home in October 2009.

In March 2011, the 2nd Battalion, 8th Field Artillery was directed to Afghanistan. In May 2011, the 2nd Battalion, 8th Field Artillery officially unfurled its colors at Forward Operating Base Lindsey, southeast of Kandahar, Afghanistan, in Regional Command – South. Throughout its year in RC-South the battalion was tasked to conduct direct support artillery for 1st Brigade's counter-insurgency operations. Throughout the battalion, most all battery and platoon positions were in two gun firebase positions spread all over RC-South. The 2nd Battalion, 8th Field Artillery redeployed to Alaska and unfurled its colors at Fort Wainwright in May 2012.

Why they call it the "Automatic" Battalion:

The 2nd Battalion, 8th Field Artillery Regiment is known as the “Automatic Battalion” or the “Automatic Eighth.”

“Of the eight battalions that were part of the regiment when I first joined 2-8 FA in August 1993, we are the lone battalion left (in the Department of the Army),” said 2-8th Commander, Lt. Col. Matthew Anderson. Of the 2-8th “Automatic” nickname, Anderson said, “The moniker goes back to the Korean War when basically everyone in the battalion manned the howitzers to fire artillery rounds to defend against a North Korean attack. So at the end of the day, the U.S. line held, and as all the North Korean prisoners of war were being moved back to the U.S. rear, they wanted to see the automatic artillery, because the rounds were being fired just that quickly,” he said.

== Lineage and honors ==
=== Lineage ===
- Constituted 1 July 1916 in the Regular Army as Battery B, 8th Field Artillery
- Organized 7 July 1916 at Fort Bliss, Texas

(8th Field Artillery assigned 6 December 1917 to the 7th Division; relieved 1 March 1921 from assignment to the 7th Division and assigned to the Hawaiian Division)

- Reorganized and redesignated 1 October 1941 as Battery B, 8th Field Artillery Battalion, an element of the 25th Infantry Division
- Inactivated 1 February 1957 in Hawaii and relieved from assignment to the 25th Infantry Division
- Redesignated 1 July 1957 as Headquarters and Headquarters Battery, 2d Howitzer Battalion, 8th Artillery, assigned to the 7th Infantry Division, and activated in Korea (organic elements concurrently constituted and activated)
- Redesignated 1 July 1963 as the 2d Battalion, 8th Artillery
- Inactivated 2 April 1971 at Fort Lewis, Washington
- Redesignated 1 September 1971 as the 2d Battalion, 8th Field Artillery
- Activated 21 April 1975 at Fort Ord, California
- Relieved 16 August 1995 from assignment to the 7th Infantry Division and assigned to the 25th Infantry Division

=== Campaign participation credit ===
- World War I: *Streamer without inscription
- World War II: *Central Pacific; *Guadalcanal; *Luzon
- Korean War: *UN Defensive; *UN Offensive; *CCF Intervention; *First UN Counteroffensive; *CCF Spring Offensive; *UN Summer-Fall Offensive; *Second Korean Winter; *Korea, Summer-Fall 1952; *Third Korean Winter; *Korea, Summer 1953
- Armed Forces Expeditions: *Panama
- War on Terrorism:

Afghanistan: *Consolidation II; *Consolidation III
Iraq: *Iraqi Governance; *Iraqi Surge

Note: Panama and GWOT awards are not listed on the official lineage, dated 2002, but they are listed on the unit website.

=== Decorations ===
- Presidential Unit Citation (Army) for TAEGU
- Presidential Unit Citation (Army) for SANGNYONG-NI
- Presidential Unit Citation (Navy) for WONJU-HWACHON
- Valorous Unit Award (Army) for Iraqi Governance, 2005
- Navy Unit Commendation for PANMUNJOM
- Meritorious Unit Citation (Army) for Iraqi Surge, 2008
- Philippine Presidential Unit Citation for 17 OCTOBER 1944 TO 4 JULY 1945
- Republic of Korea Presidential Unit Citation for MASAN-CHINJU
- Republic of Korea Presidential Unit Citation for MUNSAN-NI
- Republic of Korea Presidential Unit Citation for KOREA, 1957-1971

Battery A additionally entitled to:
- Army Superior Unit Award for 1996-1997

== See also ==
- Operation Iraqi Freedom participation from SEP 2004 to DEC 2005
