= 2nd Infantry Division Artillery (United States) =

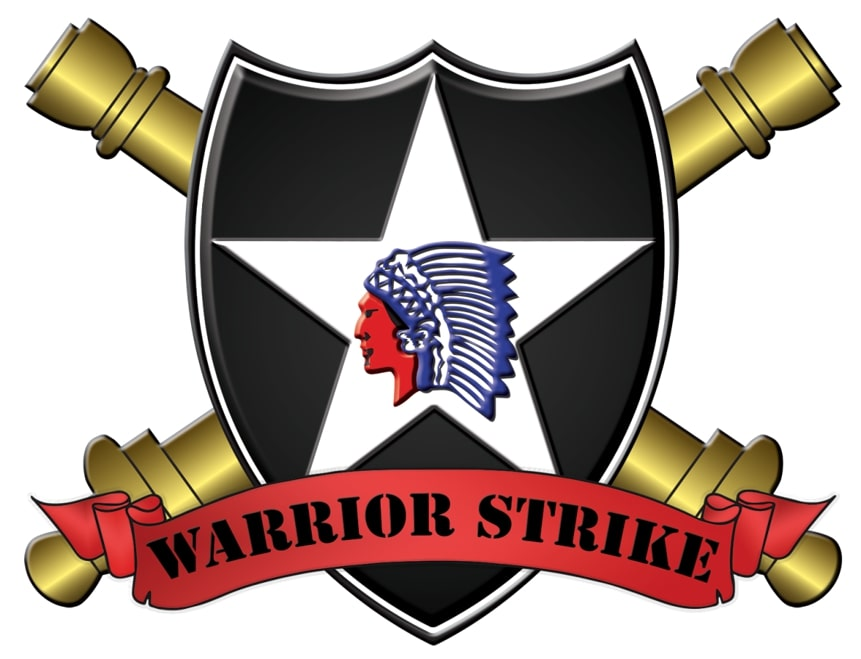
- Country: USA
- Branch: United States Army
- Type: Field artillery
- Role: Division force fires HQ
- Size: Brigade
- Part of: 2nd Infantry Division
- Garrison/HQ: Camp Humphreys
- Nickname: Warrior Strike
- Battle honours: World War I World War II; Korean War

Commanders
- Current commander: COL J. Kevin McKittrick
- Command Sergeant Major: CSM Jason D. Rivera
- Notable commanders: Lesley J. McNair (1937–1939); James Lawton Collins, (1939); Loyal M. Haynes (1949–1950); David D. Halverson (1999–2001)

The 2nd Infantry Division Artillery (DIVARTY) or "Warrior Strike" is the Force Field Artillery Headquarters for the 2nd Infantry Division. The DIVARTY has served with the division from 1917 to the present day, with combat service in World War I, World War II, and the Korean War. In addition to peacetime service with the division at Fort Lewis, Washington, Fort Benning, Georgia, and in Japan and Alaska, the DIVARTY spent 40 years in Korea. After seven years stationed at Joint Base Lewis–McChord, where the DIVARTY provided fire support coordination and mission command for the training and readiness of five field artillery battalions, the Army restationed the DIVARTY to Camp Humphreys on 16 September 2021.

== History ==
=== World War I & Interwar ===
2nd Infantry Division Artillery was constituted on 21 September 1917 amidst World War 1 in the Regular Army as Headquarters, 2nd Field Artillery Brigade. It was partially organized in October 1917 at Governors Island, New York, and assigned to the 2nd Division (later redesignated as the 2nd Infantry Division). Its organization was completed on 1 January 1918 in France, consisting of the 12th, 15th and 17th Field Artillery regiments, and the 2nd Trench Mortar battery. In France, the brigade fought in many key battles, including at Aisne, Aisne-Marne, and Meuse-Argonne. For its actions, the brigade was awarded the Croix de guerre (with two palms) and the Fourragère. After the war was over, the brigade returned home to Fort Sam Houston, where it was disbanded on 7 October 1939.

=== World War II ===
The DIVARTY was reconstituted on 10 September 1940 in the Regular Army as Headquarters and Headquarters Battery, 2nd Division Artillery, and activated on 1 October 1940 at Fort Sam Houston. Following training in the United States, the unit left for Europe to take part in World War II, where on 7 June 1944 it participated in support of the Normandy landings that took place on the previous day. Under the new "triangular" organization, the DIVARTY was composed of its headquarters battery, a 155mm general support battalion (the 12th Field Artillery Battalion) and three 105mm direct support battalions (the 15th Field Artillery Battalion, 37th Field Artillery Battalion and 38th Field Artillery Battalion). The 38th Field Artillery Battalion was detached to the 9th Armored Division for a few days in May 1945, and the DIVARTY received the attachment of numerous field artillery batteries, battalions and groups over the course of fighting from 13 June 1944 to 28 April 1945.

2nd Division Artillery moved through Europe to support the division in France, Belgium, Germany, and finally into Czechoslovakia. Following the end of the war, it left Europe to return to Camp Swift, Texas in July 1945 in preparation for deployment to the Pacific. For its actions in World War II, the unit earned the campaign streamers for Normandy, Northern France, Ardennes-Alsace and Central Europe. 2nd Division Artillery was also awarded the Belgian Fourragère for actions in Ardennes and Elsenborn Ridge.

=== Cold War ===
==== Korean War ====
Alerted on 8 July 1950, the DIVARTY, commanded by Brigadier General Loyal M. Haynes, departed from Tacoma on the USNS Frederick Funston on 22 July 1950, and arrived in Pusan on 20 August, with each individual battalions shipped with their Regimental Combat Team. In August 1950, during the Korean War, the 2nd Infantry Division moved into the Pusan perimeter to relieve the 24th Infantry Division. 2nd Division Artillery moved with its division and fired in support of US, ROK and UN forces until the end of the war. In 1954, 2nd Division Artillery returned to the U.S. at Fort Lewis, Washington. For actions in Korea the unit earned 10 Campaign streamers and was awarded two Republic of Korea Presidential Unit Citations. At least six members of the Division Artillery headquarters and medical detachment were awarded the Silver Star for actions during the Korean War:

- Brigadier General Loyal M. Haynes, 31 August 1950 – 15 September 1950, in the Naktong River Salient (GO89-50)
- Warrant Officer Junior Grade Warren E. Beckwith, 30 November 1950, near Kunu-ri, Korea (GO 328-51)
- Sergeant Leonard F. Johnson, 30 November 1950, in the vicinity of Kunu-ri, Korea (GO 124-51)
- Private First Class Paul A. Kearney, 30 November 1950, in the vicinity of Kunu-ri, Korea (GO 173-51)
- Sergeant First Class Stanley A. Brown, 12 February 1951, near Saemal, Korea (GO112-51)
- Colonel Thomas E. Deshazo, 24 May 1951, near Choltul, Korea (GO 139-51)

In 1955, the 15th and 37th Field Artillery Battalions were converted from 105 mm towed units to 105 mm self-propelled.

In 1957, the DIVARTY reorganized as part of the Army's conversion to the pentomic organization. The new DIVARTY consisted of a headquarters, a single 105 mm howitzer battalion with five batteries, and a composite general support battalion, with two 155 mm howitzer batteries of six guns, a four-gun battery of 8-inch howitzers, and an Honest John rocket battery with two launchers. On 14 June 1958 the unit was reorganized and redesignated as Headquarters and Headquarters Battery, 2nd Infantry Division Artillery. In 1960, the DIVARTY reorganized into five composite battalions, each with a battery of 155 mm howitzers and a battery of 105 mm howitzers. Each battalion was designed to provide direct support to one of the division's five infantry battle groups. Two of the battalions (6th How Bn, 37th Arty and 5th How Bn, 38th Arty) were equipped with self-propelled howitzers, while the other three battalions (1st How Bn, 15th Arty; 7th How Bn, 17th Arty; 1st How Bn, 27th Arty) fielded towed howitzers. A composite general support battalion (1st Rkt-How Bn, 12th Arty) consisted of 8-inch howitzers and Honest John rockets.

In 1965 the colors of the 2nd Infantry Division Artillery left Fort Benning, Georgia, and went to Korea, where they were used to reflag the 1st Cavalry Division. From 1965 through 2006, the DIVARTY remained in Korea to deter North Korean aggression. The DIVARTY participated in numerous exercises, including annual Team Spirit exercises from 1976–1993, in order to maintain its readiness. Units from the DIVARTY also continuously manned firebases along the Demilitarized Zone (DMZ) to provide immediate fire support to patrols in the DMZ. In 1981, the 1st Battalion, 38th Field Artillery and the 2nd Battalion, 17th Field Artillery replaced its 105mm M102 howitzers with 155mm M198 howitzers, expanding the range and lethality of the DIVARTY.

=== Post Cold War ===
Throughout the 1990s, the DIVARTY remained in South Korea to deter North Korean aggression. In 1990, the DIVARTY converted its three direct support cannon battalion organization from 3 x 6 (3 firing batteries of six howitzers each) to 3 x 8 organization, and converted a 8-8 FA from M198 towed howitzers to M109A2 self-propelled howitzers. In October 1991, the DIVARTY closed Firebase 4P3, the Army's last active firebase, and turned the DMZ mission to the Republic of Korea Army. During 1992, the DIVARTY inactivated 1-4 FA and B/6-32 FA. In 1993, the DIVARTY activated Battery A, 38th Field Artillery as a separate MLRS battery. In 1996, 8th Battalion, 8th FA reflagged to the 2nd Battalion, 17th FA. In 1997, both 1-15 FA and 2-17 FA fielded M109A6 Paladin howitzers. During 1997, the DIVARTY fielded Improved Position Determining System MLRS launchers in C/6-37 FA, and assisted the ROK Army with fielding its initial MLRS battalion, bringing the capability to deliver ATACMS Block 1A missiles.

In September 2005, the Division Artillery moved from Camp Stanley to Camp Casey, and began reorganization as a provisional 2nd Fires Brigade as part of the Army's transformation to modularity. On 30 November 2006, the 2nd Infantry Division Artillery was inactivated, and its personnel and equipment assets used to activated the 210th Fires Brigade.

The 2nd Infantry Division Artillery was reactivated at Joint Base Lewis-McChord, Washington, on 25 September 2014 to provide training oversight and professional development to the two active duty cannon battalions and one National Guard cannon battalion, 2-146 FA, at JBLM and to two cannon battalions in Alaska.

As part of the Army's force structure changes decided in late 2019, the DIVARTY was restationed to Camp Humphreys on 16 September 2021. The DIVARTY maintains its mission as the Force Field Artillery Headquarters for the 2nd Infantry Division-ROK/U.S. Combined Division.

== Lineage and honors ==
=== Lineage ===
- Constituted 21 September 1917 in the Regular Army as Headquarters, 2d Field Artillery Brigade
- Partially organized in October 1917 at Governors Island, New York, and assigned to the 2nd Division (later redesignated as the 2nd Infantry Division); organization completed 1 January 1918 in France
- Disbanded 7 October 1939 at Fort Sam Houston, Texas
- Reconstituted 10 September 1940 in the Regular Army as Headquarters and Headquarters Battery, 2nd Division Artillery
- Activated 1 October 1940 at Fort Sam Houston, Texas
- Reorganized and redesignated 14 June 1958 as Headquarters and Headquarters Battery, 2d Infantry Division Artillery
- Inactivated 30 November 2006 in Korea
- Activated 25 September 2014 at Joint Base Lewis-McChord, Washington
- Restationed 16 September 2021 to Camp Humphreys

=== Campaign participation credit ===
World War I: Aisne; Aisne-Marne; St. Mihiel; Meuse-Argonne; Ile de France 1918; Lorraine 1918

World War II: Normandy; Northern France; Rhineland; Ardennes-Alsace; Central Europe

Korean War: UN Defensive; UN Offensive; CCF Intervention; First UN Counteroffensive; CCF Spring Offensive; UN Summer–Fall Offensive; Second Korean Winter; Korea, Summer–Fall 1952; Third Korean Winter; Korea, Summer 1953

=== Decorations ===
- Presidential Unit Citation (Army) for HONGCHON
- French Croix de Guerre with Palm, World War I for AISNE-MARNE
- French Croix de Guerre with Palm, World War I for MEUSE-ARGONNE
- French Croix de Guerre, World War I, Fourragere
- Belgian Fourragere 1940
  - Cited in the Order of the Day of the Belgian Army for action in the ARDENNES
  - Cited in the Order of the Day of the Belgian Army for action at ELSENBORN CREST
- Republic of Korea Presidential Unit Citation for NAKTONG RIVER LINE
- Republic of Korea Presidential Unit Citation for KOREA

== Heraldry ==
No Heraldic Items Authorized.
