= Military parades in North Korea =

List of military parades

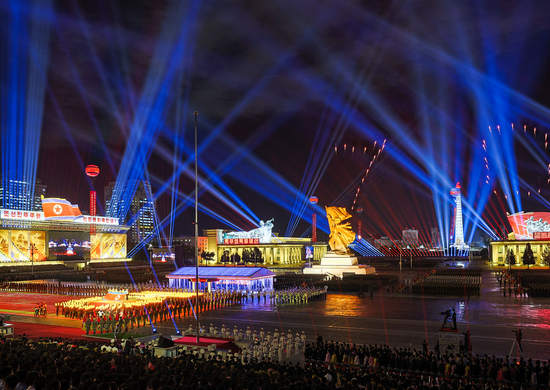
The parade in honor of the 70th anniversary of the end of the Korean War in 2023

This is a list of military parades held in Pyongyang, the capital of the Democratic People's Republic of Korea (DPRK) since 1948. All military parades consist of troops from the Korean People's Army and the paramilitary Worker-Peasant Red Guards. All military parades of a national nature are held on Pyongyang's Kim Il Sung Square with the General Secretary of the Workers' Party of Korea, President of the State Affairs Commission and Commander-in-Chief of the Armed Forces of North Korea in attendance. These parades are broadcast live on Korean Central Television.

Military parades are usually held on quinquennial or decennial anniversaries (every 5 or 10 years) and/or jubilee years (ex: 25th anniversary, 40th anniversary, 50th anniversary, 60th anniversary, 70th anniversary).

Many parade participants are awarded with special decorative medals as well as certain arrangements at their barracks.

== Military Foundation Day ==
Parades held in honor of Military Foundation Day:

=== 1948 ===
The first parade of Korean People's Army took place on Military Foundation Day in 1948. It took place at Pyongyang Station in the presence of Soviet generals from the 25th Army and Soviet Civil Administration. It included the participation of about 20,000 North Korean soldiers who stood at attention during the first part of the parade in which Premier Kim Il Sung presided as commander in chief.

=== 1972 ===
It celebrated the KPA's ruby jubilee. Unlike the first parade, this parade included more diverse contingents of troops, particularly motorized infantry. According to a later defector from the Pyongyang Defense Command, a female officer collapsed after her appendix burst following the parade, to which she was "praised" by her superiors for having concealed it. Head of the Royal Government of the National Union of Kampuchea Prince Norodom Sihanouk, Marshal of the Soviet Union Kirill Moskalenko and commander of the Shenyang Military Region Chen Xilian were among the foreign dignitaries at the parade.

=== 1992 ===
In 1992, the KPA's diamond jubilee parade was held. It saw the participation of over 20,000 active troops and 1,200 pieces of weaponry, as well veterans of all wars in which the DPRK was a participant. During the parade, KPA Supreme Commander Kim Jong Il made his first public speech during a military parade for the KPA's 60th anniversary and said: "Glory to the officers and soldiers of the heroic Korean People's Army!", which was followed by a loud applause by the crowd on the square. It was the last parade to include the Soviet-style goose step. Newly promoted Marshal O Jin-u made the keynote address and the parade was commanded by also newly promoted Vice Marshal Kim Kwang-jin.

=== 2007 ===
The parade celebrated the 75th anniversary of the KPA. General Kim Kyok-sik, the then defence chief of the DPRK, gave the keynote address. The broadcast was delayed by three hours, with speculation by experts that this was due to Kim Jong Il's absence.

=== 2013 ===
The parade celebrated the 81st anniversary of the KPA. It was one of the only times a parade was held on a non-jubilee year; the parade that was planned for the previous year was cancelled due to the preparations for the parade on the 100th anniversary of Kim Il Sung that was held ten days prior to the planned parade. It was the first to be held on the forecourt of the Kumsusan Palace of the Sun. Military hardware was not displayed during the parade. Speeches were delivered by commanders of the different branches of the KPA, during which they spoke of the military readiness of their branches.

=== 2018 ===
In 2018, the platinum jubilee anniversary of the founding of the KPA in its current form took place on 8 February that year. It was speculated that this parade, which was the first since the holiday was changed back to 8 February, was held deliberately to coincide with the 2018 Winter Olympics opening ceremony in Pyeongchang County, South Korea, during which North Korean and South Korean athletes marched together in the parade of nations. The parade included 13,000 soldiers of the KPA.

=== 2022 ===
The 90th anniversary of the Korean People's Revolutionary Army was marked with a nighttime military parade on April 25. It marked a memorable first appearance for agents and employees of the Ministry of State Security and the women's traffic police officers of the Korean People's Internal Security Forces.

For the first time, corps and force battalions had their division and regimental/wing colours carried on parade. The military's honour guard troops performed the silent drill and it was shown on the broadcast with more screen time for the first time.

The columns of the troops are as follows:

- Honor Guards, Historical Troops and Corps-level Units
1. Honorary cavalrymen
2. Soldiers in Korean People's Revolutionary Army uniform
3. Soldiers in Fatherland Liberation War period uniform consisting the Army, Navy and Air Force
4. Guard Office of the Party Central Committee
5. Guard Department of the State Affairs Commission
6. Guard Department of the Party Central Committee
7. Supreme Guard Command
8. First Corps
9. Second Corps
10. Forth Corps
11. Fifth Corps
12. Navy
13. Air Force
14. Missile Maintenance Crewmembers of the Strategic Force
15. Special Operation Force (represented by the Korean People's Army 11th Corps (조선인민군 제11군단))
16. Anti-aircraft Artillery Corps
17. 91st Corps
18. 3rd Corps
19. 7th Corps
20. 8th Corps
21. 9th Corps
22. 10th Corps
23. 12th Corps
24. Seoul Ryu Kyong Su Guards 105th Tank Division
25. Guards 123rd Tank Division
26. 425th Mechanized Infantry Division
27. 108th Mechanized Infantry Division
28. 815th Mechanized Infantry Division
29. 806th Mechanized Infantry Division
30. Scouts Infantry
31. Mountain Infantry
32. Engineer Unit
33. Chemical Warfare Unit
34. Electronic Jammer Operations Unit (represented by the Korean People's Army 191th Brigade (조선인민군 제191려단))
- Universities and Military Schools of all levels
1. Kim Il Sung Military University
2. Kim Jong Il Military-Political University
3. Kim Il Sung University of Politics
4. Kim Jong Un University of National Defence
5. Kim Jong Suk Naval University
6. Kim Chaek Air Force University
7. Kang Kon Military Academy
8. O Jin U Artillery Academy
9. Mangyongdae Revolutionary School
10. Nampo Revolutionary School and Kang Pan Sok Revolutionary School
- Worker-Peasant Red Guards, Ministry of State Security and Civil Defence
1. Worker-Peasant Red Guards
2. Ministry of State Security
3. Traffic Security Women of the Ministry of Social Security
4. Emergency Epidemic Prevention Workers
5. Tracker Dog Search Party of the Ministry of Social Security
6. Special Mobile Corps of the Ministry of Social Security

=== 2023 ===
The parade celebrated the 75th anniversary of the KPA. Supreme Leader Kim Jong Un, who presided over the celebration parade, did not make an address. It would be the first time a new ceremonial colour of the KPA would be presented in public, as well as the brand new colour designs for its service branches and component units. A bigger historical column formed part of the year's festivities, including a small mobile column of equipment used in the late 1940s. As the parade was held in February, which is winter in the country, all of the troops wore winter gear.

The columns of the troops are as follows:

- Honor Guards
1. Honorary Cavalrymen Column (명예기병종대)
- Historical Troops
1. 7th Regiment Column in the Anti-Japanese War Period (항일의 7련대상징종대)
2. Bodyguard Company of the Supreme Headquarters Column during the Fatherland Liberation War (조국해방전쟁시기 친위중대상징종대)
3. 1st National Defence Division Column during the Fatherland Liberation War (제1국방사단상징종대)
4. 2nd Lightly armed Infantry Division Column during the Fatherland Liberation War (제2경보병사단상징종대)
5. 3rd Independent Infantry Brigade Column during the Fatherland Liberation War (제3독립보병려단상징종대)
6. 4th Infantry Division Column during the Fatherland Liberation War (제4보병사단상징종대)
- Corps-level Units
1. Guard Office of the Party Central Committee (당중앙위원회 호위처종대)
2. Guard Department of the State Affairs Commission (국무위원회 경위국종대)
3. Bodyguard Department (호위국종대)
4. Supreme Guard Command (호위사령부종대)
5. 1st Corps (제1군단종대)
6. 2nd Corps (제2군단종대)
7. 4th Corps (제4군단종대)
8. 5th Corps (제5군단종대)
9. Navy (해군종대)
10. Air Force (공군종대)
11. Strategic Force (전략군종대)
12. Special Operation Force (특수작전군종대)
13. 91st Corps (제91군단종대)
14. Anti-aircraft Artillery Corps (특수작전군종대)
15. 3rd Corps (제3군단종대)
16. 7th Corps (제7군단종대)
17. 8th Corps (제8군단종대)
18. 9th Corps (제9군단종대)
19. 10th Corps (제10군단종대)
20. 12th Corps (제12군단종대)
21. Tank Armour Division (땅크장갑사단종대)
22. Seoul Ryu Kyong Su 105th Guards Armored Division (근위 서울류경수제105땅크사단종대)
23. 425th Mechanized Infantry Division (제425기계화보병사단종대)
24. 108th Mechanized Infantry Division (제108기계화보병사단종대)
25. 815th Mechanized Infantry Division (제815기계화보병사단종대)
26. 806th Mechanized Infantry Division (제806기계화보병사단종대)
27. Reconnaissance General Bureau (정찰총국종대)
28. 191 Command Intelligence Brigade (제191지휘정보려단종대)
29. 21st Engineer Brigade (제21공병려단종대)
30. 22nd Nuclearization Battalion (제22핵화학대대종대)
31. 208th Electronic Jammer Operations Unit (제208전자교란전대대종대)
32. 1st Mobile Hospital (제1기동병원종대)
- Universities and Military Schools of all levels
1. Kim Il Sung Military University (김일성군사종합대학종대)
2. Kim Jong Il University of Military and Politics (김정일군정대학종대)
3. Kim Il Sung University of Politics (김일성정치대학종대)
4. Kim Jong Suk Naval University (김정숙명칭해군대학종대)
5. Kim Chaek Air Force University (김책명칭공군대학종대)
6. Kang Kon Military Academy (강건명칭종합군관학교종대)
7. O Jin U Artillery Academy (오진우명칭포병종합군관학교종대)
8. Revolutionary Schools (혁명학원종대)

== Republic Day ==
Parades in honor of the Day of the Foundation of the Republic:

=== 1988 ===
The parade celebrated the 40th anniversary of the republic. A Polish film named Defilada (The Parade) was published in 1989 by Andrzej Fidyk, who was sent by the government of the Polish People's Republic to create a documentary on the parade as well as the larger 40th anniversary celebrations. Chinese President Yang Shangkun as well as Bulgarian Premier Georgi Atanasov were in attendance.

=== 1998 ===
It celebrated the golden jubilee of the DPRK's establishment. The massed bands included a tri-service element which included military bands from all the branches.

=== 2003 ===
It celebrated the 55th anniversary of independence. It was the largest parade seen in the country in over a decade. Contrary to what was speculated, the hour and a half parade did not feature any new missiles. Only medium range missiles were displayed in the hardware section. The parade was the last appearance of Pak Song-chol, Premier of North Korea from 1976 to 1977.

=== 2008 ===
It celebrated the diamond jubilee of the foundation of the republic. It was noted for the absence of General Secretary Kim Jong Il, which caused speculation on his state of health. Many intelligence agencies in the United States believed Kim might be "gravely ill" after suffering from a stroke, which caused his absence from the parade. Only the Worker-Peasant Red Guards took part, providing personnel and equipment for the march past and the mobile column.

=== 2011 ===
It celebrated the 63rd anniversary of independence. It marked one of the last appearances by Kim Jong Il and his successor Kim Jong Un together. The parade followed the former's return from a state visit to Russia. Just like in 2008, the Worker-Peasant Red Guards made up the majority of the parading units.

=== 2013 ===
The parade marked the 65th anniversary of the establishment of the republic, Worker-Peasant Red Guards made up the majority of the parading units.

=== 2018 ===
In 2018, North Korea marked the 70th anniversary of its foundation. The parade was inspected by Vice Marshal Ri Yong-gil and saw the introduction of new camouflage inspection vehicles. It also saw the rare refrain from displaying intercontinental ballistic missiles. Russian Federation Council Chairman Valentina Matviyenko and Mauritanian President Mohamed Ould Abdel Aziz, as well as delegations from Cuba, Syria, Lebanon, the State of Palestine, Uganda, and South Africa were in attendance during the celebrations. General Secretary of the Chinese Communist Party Xi Jinping was expected to attend the parade during his state visit to North Korea on 9 September, but cancelled his attendance, instead sending Li Zhanshu, the Chairman of the Standing Committee of the National People's Congress. U.S. president Donald Trump displayed the parade as an accomplishment in the Korean peace process, noting the lack of ICBMs that were paraded. This is the final parade in DPRK where the quick march is performed with the iconic bouncing/90 degrees goose step, ending the era of songun military appearance. The new marching step was seen in the next parade which is the 2020 October parade, showing the return of the Soviet style goose-step.

The columns of the troops are as follows:

- Historical Division (troops that participated the anti Japanese war, Victorious Fatherland Liberation War, and other related militant or non-militant operations)
1. Officers of the Korean People's Revolutionary Army
2. Central Security Cadres School
3. Guards of the 38th Parallel
4. Guards Seoul Kim Chaek 4th Infantry Division
5. Seoul Ryu Kyong Su 105th Guards Armored Division
6. 2nd Guards Torpedo Boat Squadron
7. 56th Guard Fighter Aircraft Regiment
8. Taedeoksan column (대덕산종대)
9. Navy Headquarters No. 1
10. Air Force
11. Panmunjom Guards Personnel
12. Artillerymen of the 4th Corps
13. Guards Heroes 1st Brigade
14. West Sea Barrage Construction Personnel
15. Hainam Island Frontline Unit (해남도전선부대 종대)
16. Air Force personnel which participated in the Vietnam War
17. Military Supply Industry Sector which contributed the supply of weaponry for the Cuban Revolution
- Corps-level Units
1. 1st Corps (제1군단종대)
2. 2nd Corps (제2군단종대)
3. 5th Corps (제5군단종대)
4. Unit 216 of the Navy (해군종대)
5. Unit 415 of the Air Force (공군종대)
6. Unit 108 of the Strategic Forces (전략군종대)
7. 11th Coprs of the Special Operation Forces (특수작전군 제11군단종대)
8. Navy Snipers
9. Air Force Snipers
10. 91st Corps
11. Pyongyang Anti-aircraft Artillery Corps
12. 3rd Corps (제3군단종대)
13. 12th Corps (제12군단종대)
14. 425th Mechanized Infantry Division (제425기계화보병사단종대)
15. 518th Infantry Division
- Universities and Military Schools of all levels
1. Kim Il Sung Military University (김일성군사종합대학종대)
2. Kim Il Sung University of Politics (김일성정치대학종대)
3. Kim Jong-il Military Research Institute
4. National Defence University
5. Kim Jong Suk Naval University
6. Kim Chaek Air Force University
7. Kang Kon Military Academy
8. Choe Hyon Military Technical Academy
9. Kim Sung Guk Anti-aircraft Artillery Academy
10. Ri Ul Sol Guard General Service Military Academy
11. Kim Jong Il University of People's Security
12. Mangyongdae Revolutionary School
13. Kang Pan Sok Revolutionary school
14. Nampo Revolutionary School
- Worker-Peasant Red Guards branches
1. Officers of the Worker-Peasant Red Guards
2. Male personnel
3. Female personnel
4. Red Youth Guards

=== 2021 ===
In 2021, a civilian, internal and paramilitary forces parade took place on the midnight leading up to 9 September. This parade did not feature the Korean People's Army Ground Force and no associated heavy weaponry; it instead featured the Worker-Peasant Red Guards of various provinces and the Ministry of Public Security. Other units featured were the firefighters of Pyongyang, Air Koryo, Ministry of Railways, Kim Chaek Iron and Steel Complex, Huichon Ryonha Machine Factory, Hungnam Fertilizer Complex, Rakwon General Machine Enterprise, Chollima Steel Complex, Ryongsong Machine Complex, Sunchon Area Youth Coal Mining Complex, Pyongyang Kim Jong Suk Textile Mill, Ministry of Public Health, State Academy of Sciences, people involved in culture, Kim Il Sung University, Kim Chaek University of Technology and the Young Red Guards. Parachutists carrying the national flag landed in Kim Il-sung Square and various aircraft overflew the square, shooting flares. The WPK PAD Director Ri Il-hwan made a speech at the parade.

=== 2023 ===
North Korea's Leader Kim Jong Un presided over a meeting on August 10, 2023, which the Central Military Commission of the WPK discussed preparations for the upcoming Military Parade marking the 75th (Diamond Jubilee) Anniversary of the Founding of the Republic in Pyongyang. It was expected that the parade would be more focusing on the country's militia forces, mostly the Worker-Peasant Red Guards. The parade was held as scheduled.

The columns of the troops are as follows:

1. Capital city Party members division
2. Pyongyang Municipality branch
3. North Phyongan Province branch
4. South Phyongan Province branch
5. North Hwanghae Province branch
6. South Hwanghae Province branch
7. Jagang Province branch
8. Kangwon Province branch
9. North Hamgyong Province branch
10. South Hamgyong Province branch
11. Ryanggang Province branch
12. Nampo City branch
13. Rason City branch
14. Kaesong City branch
15. Kim Il Sung University branch
16. Kim Chaek University of Technology branch
17. Hwanghae Iron and Steel Complex branch
18. Namhung Youth Chemical Complex branch
19. Pukchang Thermal Power Complex branch
20. Sunchon Area Youth Coal Mining Complex branch
21. Ryongsung Machinery Combined Corporation branch
22. Sangwon Cement Complex branch
23. Korean State Railway branch
24. Kim Jong Suk Pyongyang Textile Mill branch
25. Wonhwa Farm of Phyongwon County branch
26. State Academy of Sciences branch
27. Ministry of Culture branch
28. Ministry of Physical Culture and Sports branch
29. Ministry of Public Health branch
30. Young Red Guards

== Workers Party Day ==
Parades in honor of Party Foundation Day:

=== 1995 ===
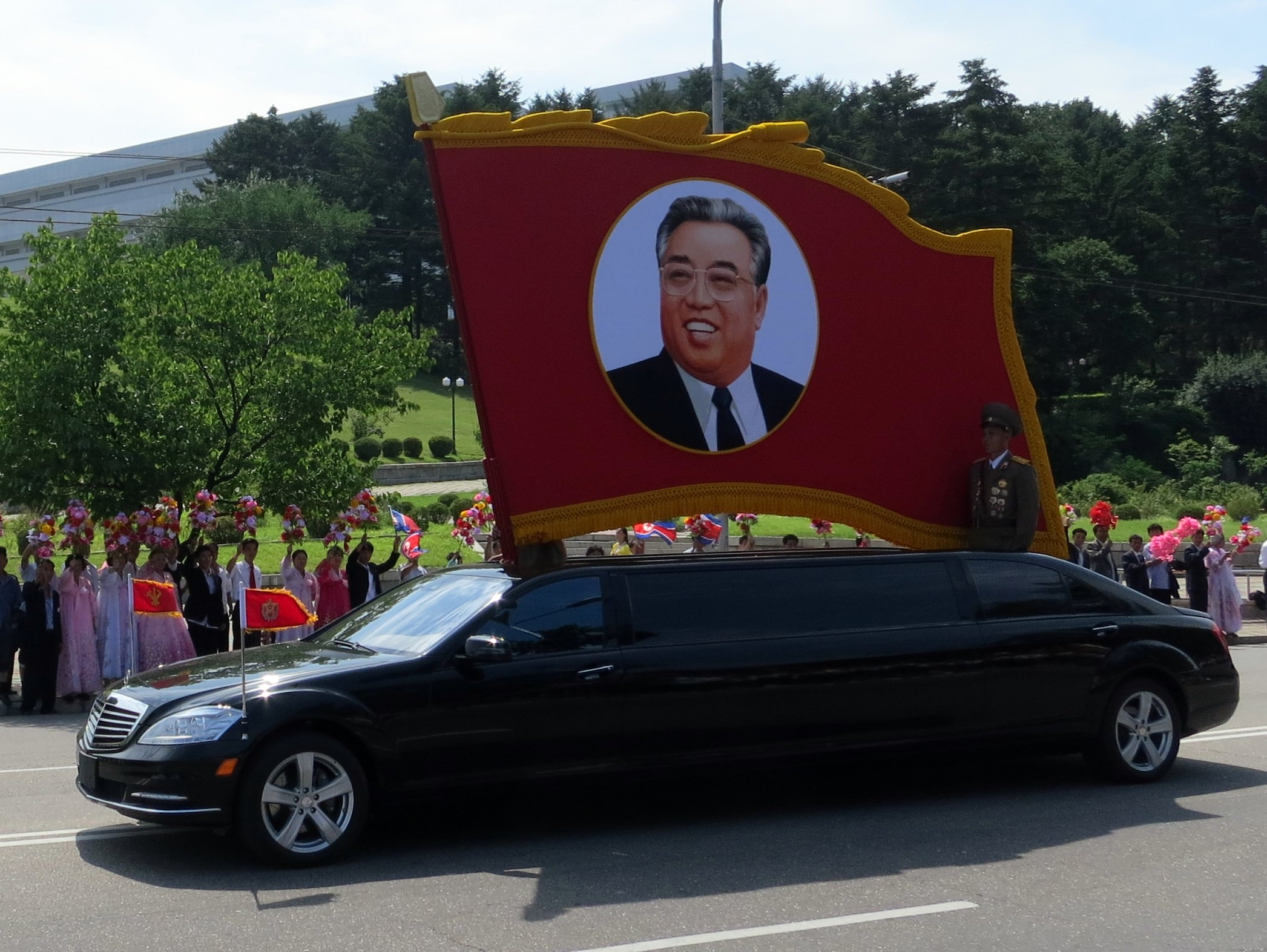
After the death of Kim Il Sung in 1994, every march past at large-scale North Korean military parades from 1997 to 2018 would be led by a black limousine carrying a red flag with Kim Il Sung's portrait.

Celebrated the 50th golden jubilee anniversary of the WPK. The parade was the first of its kind held in the country. It was the first parade presided by Kim Jong Il as leader of the country. Defence minister Choe Kwang delivered the keynote address at the ceremony.

=== 2000 ===
Celebrated the 55th anniversary of the WPK.

=== 2005 ===
It celebrated the 60th anniversary of the WPK.

=== 2010 ===
Celebrated the 65th anniversary of the WPK. It was the first time Kim Jong Il's successor Kim Jong Un had appeared at a military parade. This appearance came two weeks after Kim was made Kim Jong Un was made a daejang (four-star general) and was appointed Vice Chairman of the Central Military Commission of the Workers' Party of Korea. This was seen as a sign of Kim's future as the next leader of the country. This was the first parade to allow full international press access, an unprecedented decision. Chief of the General Staff Ri Yong-ho gave the keynote speech. It displayed new surface-to-air missiles that resembled the S-300 and the HQ-9. The central chant of the parade was: "Kim Jong Il! Protect him to the death! Kim Jong Il, let's unite to support him!" It was the last time the Mercedes-Benz 600 was used in a military parade.

=== 2015 ===
The parade marked the 70th anniversary of the WPK. It was delayed for several hours due to thunderstorms that took place the night before. The parade did not feature any new weapons such as UAVs or ballistic missiles. Chinese First Secretary of the Secretariat of the Chinese Communist Party Liu Yunshan was in attendance. It also preceded the announcement of the 7th Congress of the Workers' Party of Korea. Among the parade formations was the Paektusan Hero Youth Shock Brigade, which came to Pyongyang at the personal request of Kim Jong Un.

=== 2020 ===
The 2020 parade marked the 75th anniversary of the foundation of the WPK. The parade was held in spite of the COVID-19 pandemic, with many foreign observers noticing the lack of facemasks in the parade and in the audience stands. The Kim Jong Un National Defense University participated in the parade for the first time. The school dean was put in charge of the school's preparation for the parade and a former soldier with "relevant experience" served as flag bearer for the KJU University colour. Renovations to the viewing platform om Kim Il Sung Square were made for the parade, with a new marble viewing platform replacing the previous one used for parades. Also, it was the first to be held at midnight, and saw the return of the Soviet style goose-step as the official parade step of all KPA formations. Additionally, Chinese military influences were also observed, such as the style of flag raising and turning of heads during parade inspection. Formations of military academy officers were dressed in a new redesigned full dress uniform that bore similarities to the Russian military uniform that was introduced in 2017. Generals, marshals and admirals wore new double-breasted dress uniforms based on those worn by Zhukov, Rokossovsky and other World War II Soviet marshals, generals and admirals at the Moscow Victory Parade of 1945. In addition new uniforms debuted which featured digital camouflage, replacing the classic combat uniforms that were used for many years. The massed military bands performed an exhibition drill routine, shaping the numbers "10.10", "1945", and "2020" during the prelude to the parade. In the mobile column, the most notable addition to the parade were four liquid-fueled ICBMs, unveiled for the first time since 2018. This parade also introduced a new main battle tank that had not previously been seen, the unofficially named M2020.

=== 2025 ===
The year marked the 80th anniversary of the WPK, where a military parade took place after dusk of the anniversary day. Several foreign dignitaries attended the parade alongside Kim Jong Un, who made the keynote address. Given the rainy weather, the planned air force flypast and drone show was called off at the last minute.

The columns of the march past troops are as follows:

- Historical Division
1. O Jung Hup-led 7th Regiment (항일의 오중흡 7련대상징종대)
2. Guards Units during the Fatherland Liberation War (조국해방전쟁시기 근위부대상징종대)
3. Seoul Guards 105th Armored Division (근위 서울제105기계화사단상징종대)
4. Arduous March composite battalion of KPA formations that received the title of O Jung Hup-led 7th Regiment (고난의 행군시기 오중흡7련대칭호를 쟁취한 부대상징종대)
- Honor Guards and Corps-level Units
1. Honorary Cavalrymen (명예기병종대)
2. Guard Office of the Party Central Committee (당중앙위원회 호위처종대)
3. Guard Department of the State Affairs Commission (국무위원회 경위국종대)
4. Guard Department of the Party Central Committee (호위국종대)
5. Supreme Guard Command (호위사령부종대)
6. First Corps (제1군단종대)
7. Second Corps (제2군단종대)
8. Forth Corps (제4군단종대)
9. Fifth Corps (제5군단종대)
10. Navy (해군종대)
11. Air Force (공군종대)
12. Strategic Forces (전략군종대)
13. Special Operation Forces (특수작전군종대)
14. Overseas Operation Battalion (해외작전부대종대)
15. Mountain Warfare in the Enemy Rear Unit (적후산악활동부대종대)
16. 41st Amphibious Shock Battalion (Seaborne Assault Battalion) (제41상륙돌격대대종대)
17. 91st Corps (제91군단종대)
18. Pyongyang Anti-aircraft Missile Corps (평양지구반항공미싸일사단종대)
19. 3rd Corps (제3군단종대)
20. 7th Corps (제7군단종대)
21. 8th Corps (제8군단종대)
22. 9th Corps (제9군단종대)
23. 10th Corps (제10군단종대)
24. 12th Corps (제12군단종대)
25. General Border Guards Bureau (국경경비총국종대)
26. Tank and Armoured Division (땅크장갑사단종대)
27. Seoul Ryu Kyong Su 105th Guards Armored Division (근위 서울류경수제105땅크사단종대)
28. 425th Mechanized Infantry Division (제425기계화보병사단종대)
29. 108th Mechanized Infantry Division (제108기계화보병사단종대)
30. 815th Mechanized Infantry Division (제815기계화보병사단종대)
31. 806th Mechanized Infantry Division (제806기계화보병사단종대)
32. General Reconnaissance and Intelligence Bureau (정찰정보총국종대)
33. Sniper Column of GRIB (저격수종대)
34. Signalmen Column (통신병종대)
35. Engineers Column (공병종대)
36. CBRN Warfare Column (화학병종대)
37. Military Service Support Battalion (군의 근무종대)
- Universities and Military Schools at all levels
1. Kim Il Sung Military University (김일성군사종합대학종대)
2. Kim Jong Il Military and Political Academy (김정일군정대학종대)
3. Kim Il Sung Political University (김일성정치대학종대)
4. Kim Jong Un University of National Defence (김정은국방종합대학종대)
5. Kim Jong-suk Naval University (김정숙명칭 해군대학종대)
6. Kim Chaek Air Force Academy (김책명칭 공군대학종대)
7. Rim Chun Chu Military University of Medical Sciences (림춘추명칭 군의 대학종대)
8. Kang Kon Military Academy (강건명칭 종합군관학교종대)
9. O Jin U Artillery Academy (오진우명칭 포병종합군관학교종대)
10. Choe Hyon Military Technical Academy (최현명칭 기술군관학교종대)
- Law Enforcement Agencies
1. Ministry of State Security (국가보위성종대)
2. Ministry of Public Security (사회안전성종대)
3. Special Task Force for Public Security (Social Security Forces) (사회안전특별기동대종대)
- Revolutionary Schools
1. Mangyongdae Revolutionary School (만경대혁명학원종대)
2. Chilgol Revolutionary School (칠골혁명학원종대)
3. Nampo Revolutionary School (남포혁명학원종대)
- Other Institutions and Militia Groups
1. Academy of Defence Sciences Reserve Military Training Units Battalion (국방과학원종대)
2. Worker-Peasant Red Guards (로농적위군종대)
3. Red Youth Guards (소년근위대종대)

Attending dignitaries included the following:

- Premier of China Li Qiang
- Deputy Chairman of the Security Council of Russia Dmitry Medvedev
- General Secretary of the Communist Party of Vietnam To Lam

== National Liberation Day/Victory Day ==
Parades in honor of the National Liberation Day of Korea and the Day of Victory in the Great Fatherland Liberation War:

=== 1949 and 1953-60 ===
The 1949 Liberation day parade was the first parade held since the DPRK's establishment. Held at Pyongyang Station, it celebrated the 4th liberation anniversary. A parade was held again in 1953 after the end of the Korean War, and then conducted every year until 1960. The 1960 parade celebrated the 15th anniversary of liberation. It was the last parade to be held until 1985.

=== 1985 ===
The parade was part of country's 40th anniversary of liberation ceremonies. In attendance was First Deputy Premier of the Soviet Union and future President of Azerbaijan Heydar Aliyev. The North Korean Koksan self-propelled gun was unveiled at the parade. Other notable attendees included O Jin-u, Kim Jong Il, and Marshal Vasily Petrov (Commander-in-Chief of the Soviet Army).

=== 1993 ===
This parade celebrated the ruby jubilee of the Korean armistice. It was the first one of its kind held in its honor and the only one held for 20 years.

=== 2013 ===
Ballistic missiles during a Victory Day, 27 July 2013

It celebrated the diamond jubilee since the armistice. It was attended by representatives of veterans groups from China and the DPRK, with Chinese Vice President Li Yuanchao attending on behalf of Xi Jinping. It was also attended by Chinese volunteers who fought on the side of the DPRK as part of People's Volunteer Army.

Outside of Vice President Li, attending dignitaries included the following:

- Former PLA Air Force commander Yu Zhenwu
- Mongolian Vice Minister of Defense Avirmed Battor
- Deputy Commander of the Armed Forces of the Islamic Republic of Iran Sayed Hamidreza Tabatabaei
- Vice President of Uganda Edward Ssekandi
- Vice President of Zambia Guy Scott
- Assistant Secretary-General of the National Command of the Syrian Ba'ath Party Abdullah al-Ahmar
- Deputy Chairman of the Russian Society of Veterans of the Korean War Janus Kanov

Politburo member U Tong-chuk appeared at the parade after a 17-month absence. Choe Ryong-hae, the director of the KPA General Political Bureau delivered the keynote address, saying that "a peaceful environment is important for the country that gives priority to economic construction and improvement of the lives of our people". American-made MD Helicopters MD 500 were unveiled during the parade.

=== 2023 ===
Prior to the anniversary day, analysis suggested that North Korea would hold a military parade to celebrate the 70th anniversary of the armistice by satellite imagery observation of the country's military, where they were seen doing practice and rehearsal for the upcoming parade.

The parade was held on the night of the anniversary day where delegates from Russia and China was invited to the parade. This is the first time North Korea invited foreign delegates to the country's military parade since the COVID-19 pandemic. The parade displayed the country's latest defence arsenal such as airborne and underwater drones. Once more Kim Jong-un did not make the keynote address that night, instead Kang Sun-nam was delegated to give the address to the nation.

The columns of the troops are as follows:

- Historical Division of the KPA during the Fatherland Liberation War
1. Wartime Officers, with the portrait of Kim Il Sung (조국해방전쟁시기 지휘관종대)
2. Bodyguard Company (조국해방전쟁시기 친위중대)
3. Guards Kang Kon 2nd Infantry Division (근위 강건제2보병사단)
4. Guards Seoul 3rd Infantry Division (근위 서울제3보병사단)
5. Guards Seoul Kim Chaek 4th Infantry Division (근위 서울김책제4보병사단)
6. Guards 6th Infantry Division (근위 제6보병사단)
7. Andong 12th Infantry Division (안동 제12보병사단)
8. Composite Battalion from 10th, 18th, 14th and 86th Guards Infantry Divisions (근위보병련대들)
9. 56th Guard Fighter Aircraft Regiment (근위 제56추격기련대)
10. Second Torpedo Boat Squadron (근위 제2어뢰정대)
11. Railway Soldiers (조국해방전쟁시기 철도병부대)
12. Ministry of Social Security (내무성 군대)
13. Guerilla Battalion of Socialist Patriotic Youth League and Korean Children's Union (조국해방전쟁시기 소년 및 남녀빨찌산종대)
14. Mechanized Contingent consisting Seoul Occupation Unit (조국해방전쟁시기 서울점령부대), Guards Anti-air Artillery Regiments (근위고사포병련대들) and Heavy Machinegun Carriages (중기마차종대)
- Honor Guards and Corps-level Units
1. Honorary Cavalrymen (명예기병종대)
2. Security Office of the WPK Central Committee (당중앙위원회 호위처종대)
3. Guard Department of the State Affairs Commission (국무위원회 경위국종대)
4. Bodyguard Department (호위국종대)
5. Supreme Guard Command (호위사령부종대)
6. 1st Corps (제1군단종대)
7. 2nd Corps (제2군단종대)
8. 5th Corps (제5군단종대)
9. 4th Corps (제4군단종대)
10. Navy (해군종대)
11. Air Force (공군종대)
12. Strategic Forces (전략군종대)
13. Special Operation Forces (특수작전군종대)
14. Mountain Warfare Unit (적후산악활동부대종대)
15. 41st Amphibious Shock Battalion (제41상륙돌격대대종대)
16. 91st Corps (제91군단종대)
17. Pyongyang Anti-aircraft Missile Corps (평양지구반항공미싸일사단종대)
18. 3rd Corps (제3군단종대)
19. 7th Corps (제7군단종대)
20. 8th Corps (제8군단종대)
21. 9th Corps (제9군단종대)
22. 10th Corps (제10군단종대)
23. 12th Corps (제12군단종대)
24. Tank Armour Division (땅크장갑사단종대)
25. Seoul Ryu Kyong Su 105th Guards Armored Division (근위 서울류경수제105땅끄사단종대)
26. 425th Mechanized Infantry Division (제425기계화보병사단종대)
27. 108th Mechanized Infantry Division (제108기계화보병사단종대)
28. 815th Mechanized Infantry Division (제815기계화보병사단종대)
29. 806th Mechanized Infantry Division (제806기계화보병사단종대)
30. Reconnaissance General Bureau (정찰총국종대)
- Universities and Military Schools of all levels
1. Kim Il Sung Military University (김일성군사종합대학종대)
2. Kim Jong Il University of Military and Politics (김정일군정대학종대)
3. Kim Il Sung University of Politics (김일성정치대학종대)
4. Mangyongdae Revolutionary School (만경대혁명학원종대)
5. Kang Pan Sok Revolutionary School (강반석혁명학원종대)
- Worker-Peasant Red Guards, Ministry of State Security and Civil Defence
1. Worker-Peasant Red Guards (로농적위군종대)
2. Ministry of State Security (국가보위성종대)
3. Ministry of Social Security (사회안전성종대)
4. Social Security Forces SWAT and K9 Composite Battalion (사회안전군 무장기동부대종대)
- Mechanized Columns
1. M2020 tank x6
2. KN-25 x6
3. Launch vehicle of Hwasal-2 x6
4. Launch vehicle of Hwasong-11A (KN-23) x6
5. Launch vehicle of Hwasong-11B (KN-24) x6
6. "Haeil" long-endurance nuclear torpedo x4
7. Anti-aircraft surface to air missile x4
8. Saetbyol-9 x4
9. Hwasong-12B x4
10. Hwasong-18 x4 (brought by the Second Red Flag Company of the Missile Administration)
11. Hwasong-17 x4

Attending dignitaries included the following:

- Russian Minister of Defence Sergei Shoigu
- First Vice Chairman of the Standing Committee of the National People's Congress Li Hongzhong

=== 2024, 2025, and 2026 ===
A smaller scale military parade was held on that day at the plaza of Pyongyang Indoor Stadium - as of the present the only standard military parade held annually in the country, outside of those held in jubilee years. The participating parade contingents were mostly historical columns from the war all with autentic weaponry, with cadets and officer students taking the rear. In 2024, no less than Kim Jong Un was the presiding officer of that first parade there, returning there in 2026. That year the annual holiday parade was given a new look with a small historical mobile column and the pre-parade inspection of the line both added in, an additional input given the positive reception to the KPA's first ever appearance in the Moscow Victory Day Parade earlier that May.

== Day of the Sun/Day of the Shining Star ==
Parades in honor of the Day of the Sun and the Day of the Shining Star:

=== February 2012 ===
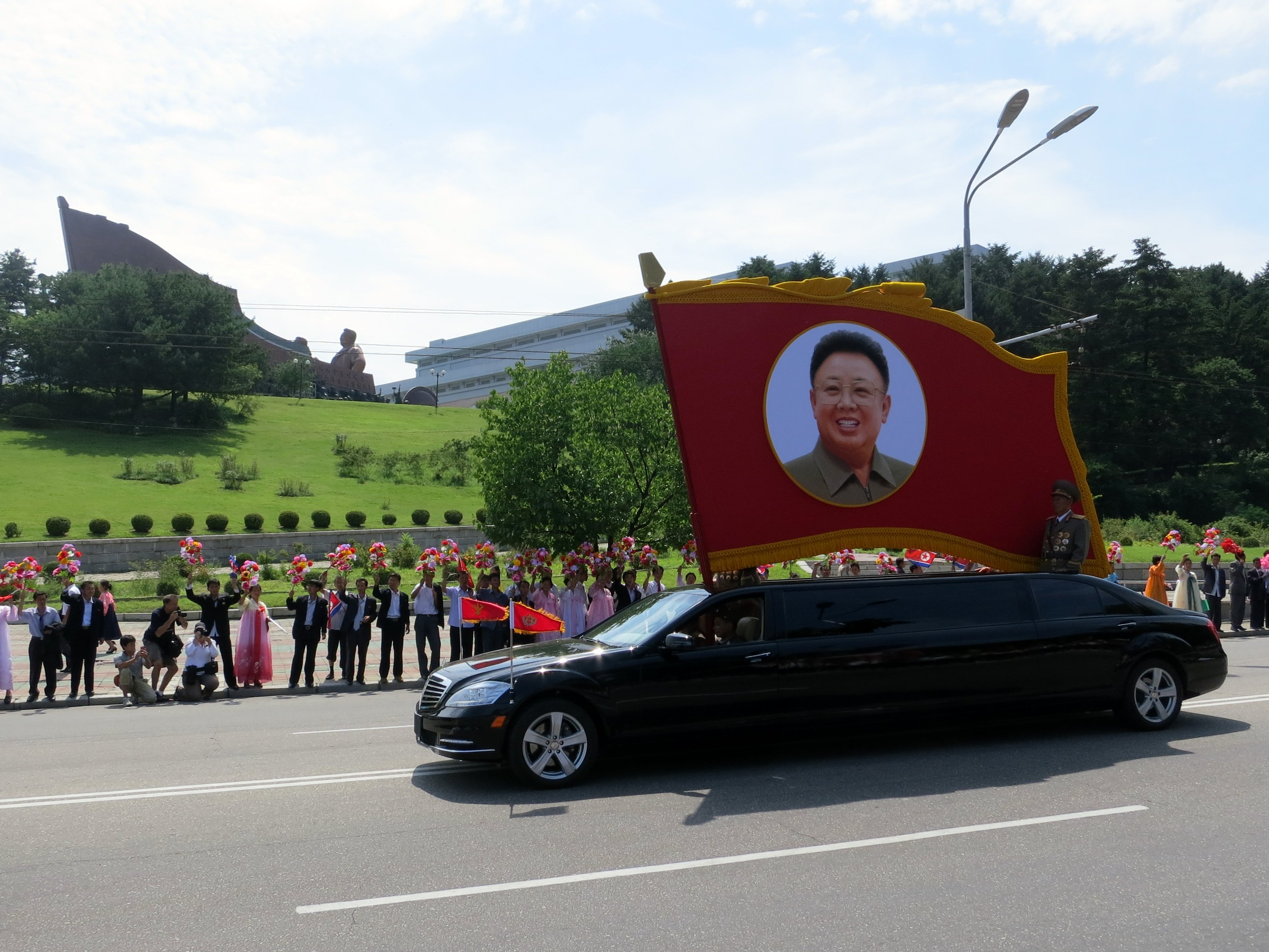
After the death of Kim Jong Il in 2011, every march past at North Korean military parades from 2012 to 2018 would have a black limousine carrying a red flag with Kim Jong Il's portrait following behind a black limousine carrying a red flag with his father Kim Il Sung's portrait.

2012 marked the 70th anniversary of the birth of Kim Jong Il. It was the first one of its nature held as the holiday was only elevated to the status of a national holiday following the death and state funeral of Kim Jong Il. It was the first parade during which Kim Jong Un attended in the position of Supreme Leader of North Korea, and was held at the forecourt of the Kumsusan Palace of the Sun.

=== April 2012 ===
2012 marked the centenary of the birth of Kim Il Sung. On the Day of the Sun that year, current leader Kim Jong Un gave his first public speech. The KPA introduced the new Hwasong-13 missile was in a parade. It also presented its UAVs for the first time during this parade. BBC reporter John Sudworth described the parade as one where "he could feel the ground shake as soldiers and rockets passed by". Markus Schiller, a weapons analyst, expressed his surprise with an ICBM's appearance, noting that most technology seen before were "one quarter of the size". Kim Jong Un's 20-minute address was his first speech since assuming the leadership. Officially published under the title of, Let Us March Forward Dynamically Towards Final Victory, Holding Higher the Banner of Songun, it was the basis of for the writing of the song, Onwards Toward the Final Victory.

=== 2017 ===
In 2017, the parade celebrated the 105th anniversary of the birth of the Kim Il Sung. During the parade, a new unit of Korean People's Army Special Operation Force wearing modern combat gear, including night-vision goggles and plate carriers, marched along with elements of the Korean People's Army in a parade on the 105th anniversary of the birth of the founder of North Korea Kim Il Sung in Pyongyang. Korean Central Television compared the new unit to the U.S. Navy SEALs and they described it with the name Lightning Commandos. The Pukguksong-2 and the Hwasong-12 were unveiled at the parade. Delegations from socialist parties attended the festivities, including a delegation of the Party of Socialists of the Republic of Moldova led by MP Grigore Novac.

The columns of the troops are as follows:

- Historical Troops
1. Soldiers in Korean People's Revolutionary Army uniform
2. Soldiers in constabulary force uniform
3. Soldiers in the Fatherland Liberation War period uniform
- Guards and Various Divisions from the Fatherland Liberation War
1. Guards Seoul 3rd Infantry Division
2. Guards Seoul Kim Chaek 4th Infantry Division
3. Guards Kang Kon 2nd Infantry Division
4. 6th Infantry Division
5. Andong Choe Chun Guk 12th Infantry Division
6. Seoul Ryu Kyong Su Guards 105th Tank Division
7. Guards Ri Hun 18th Infantry Regiment
8. Guards 2nd Torpedo Boat Group
9. Guards 56th Interceptor Group
10. Guards 10th Infantry Regiment
11. Guards 14th Infantry Regiment
12. Guards 86th Infantry Regiment
13. Guards 19th Anti-aircraft Artillery Regiment
14. Guards 23rd Anti-aircraft Artillery Regiment
15. Guards 1st Infantry Division
16. Guards 1st Air Division
17. Guards 60th Interceptor Group
- Corps-level Units
1. Navy
2. Air Force
3. Strategic Force
4. Special Operation Force
5. 1st Corps
6. 2nd Corps
7. 4th Corps
8. 5th Corps
9. 91st Training Institute
10. 3rd Corps
11. 7th Corps
12. 8th Corps
13. 9th Corps
14. 10th Corps
15. 12th Corps
16. Pyongyang Anti-aircraft Artillery Corps
17. 425th Training Division
18. 108th Training Division
19. 815th Training Division
20. 806th Training Division
- Infantry Divisions
1. 46th Infantry Division
2. 9th Infantry Division
3. 25th Infantry Division
4. 13th Infantry Division
5. 15th Infantry Division
6. 5th Infantry Division
- Universities and Military Schools at all levels
1. Kim Il Sung Military University
2. Kim Il Sung University of Politics
3. Kim Jong Suk Naval University
4. Kim Chaek Air Force University
5. O Jung Hup Defence University
6. Rim Chun Chu Military University of Medical Sciences
7. Kim Il Sung Military University Female Cadre Training Center
8. Kang Kon Military Academy
9. O Jin U Artillery Academy
10. Choe Hyon Military Academy
11. Choe Chun Guk Tank-Automobile Military Academy
12. Choe Kwang Signal Corps Military Academy
13. Kim Sung Guk Anti-aircraft Artillery Academy
14. Ri Ul Sol Guard General Service Military Academy
15. Kim Jong Il University of People's Security
16. Mangyongdae Revolutionary School
17. Kang Pan Sok Revolutionary school
18. Nampo Revolutionary School
- Worker-Peasant Red Guards branches
1. Pyongyang City Branch
2. South Pyongan Province Branch
3. North Pyongan Province Branch
4. South Hamgyong Province Branch
5. North Hamgyong Province Branch
6. South Hwanghae Province Branch
7. North Hwanghae Province Branch
8. Ryanggang Province Branch
9. Chagang Province Branch
10. Kangwon Province Branch
11. Nampo City Branch
12. Kim Il Sung University Branch
13. Kim Chaek University of Technology Branch
14. Pyongyang Medical University Female Branch
15. Pyongyang University of Architecture Branch
16. Han Tok Su University Of Light Industry Branch

== Other parades ==
=== June 1972 ===
A special parade was held outside of Pyongyang for the first time on 6 June 1972 in the northeastern border city of Hyesan, Ryanggang Province. It commemorated the 35th anniversary of the Battle of Pochonbo, during which the Korean People's Revolutionary Army, backed by the Northeast Anti-Japanese United Army, defeated a Japanese detachment based in Pochon County. The parade was attended by President Kim Il Sung and was officiated by the party secretary for the province. Yi Yong-mu, a member of the Central Committee and later Director General of the General Political Bureau delivered a speech at the parade on Hyesan Square.

=== May 2016 ===
A civil parade was held after the 7th Congress of the Workers' Party of Korea on 10 May 2016.

=== January 2021 ===
A parade was held after the 8th Congress of the Workers' Party of Korea on 16 January 2021. It began at around six in the evening lasting over 2 hours. General Kim Jong-gwan was the keynote speaker at the parade, with Marshal Ri Pyong-chol (the Vice Chairman of the Central Military Commission of the Workers' Party of Korea) serving as parade inspector. The headliner of the parade was a new submarine-launched ballistic missile known as the Pukguksong-5, which KCNA declared was "the world's most powerful weapon". However, no ICBMs were displayed. The column of planes depicted number "8" with fireworks in the sky.

The columns of the troops are as follows:

1. Honor cavalrymen
2. Guard Office of the Party Central Committee
3. Guard Department of the State Affairs Commission
4. Guard Department of the Party Central Committee
5. Guard Command
6. First Corps
7. Second Corps
8. Forth Corps
9. Fifth Corps
10. Navy
11. Air Force
12. Strategic Force
13. Ground Snipers of the Special Operation Force
14. Sea Snipers of the Special Operation Force
15. Air Snipers of the Special Operation Force
16. Lightly armed Infantrymen
17. Anti-aircraft Artillerymen
18. 91st Corps
19. 3rd Corps
20. 7th Corps
21. 8th Corps
22. 9th Corps
23. 10th Corps
24. 12th Corps
25. Tank Units and Armored Infantry Divisions
26. Seoul Ryu Kyong Su Guards 105th Tank Division
27. 425th Mechanized Infantry Division
28. 108th Mechanized Infantry Division
29. 815th Mechanized Infantry Division
30. 806th Mechanized Infantry Division
31. Mountain Warfare Infantrymen
32. Reconnoiters
33. Electronic Harassment Unit
34. Engineer Unit
35. Chemical Warfare Unit
36. Armed Mobile Unit for Public Security

The following day, the Joint Chiefs of Staff of South Korea detected signs of the parade in central Pyongyang, which resulted in a statement by Kim Yo Jong condemning South Korea, describing it as "weird" for the South Koreans made a "senseless statement that they captured the north opening a military parade at midnight on Jan. 10". A couple of days later, another government statement was released criticizing the statement by Japanese Defence Minister Nobuo Kishi, who said that Japan is analyzing information linked to weapons unveiled at the parade. On 17 January, General Secretary Kim Jong Un had a photo session with the participants in the military parade.

=== February 2026 ===
Same as January 2021 with the same purpose, a military parade was held in commemoration of the 9th Congress of the Workers' Party of Korea. The parade took place on 25 February 2026. Unlike the 2021 parade, no mobile column was present and only an aviation flypast was held, a sort of make up for the cancelled flypast from the previous parade held the year before.

In a departure from the usual norm of past parades, Kim Jong Un arrived at the front of the parade grandstand of Kim Il-sung Square instead of the usual rear of the square via motorcade. He made the keynote address that night to an assembled formation of 14,000 stating the Party's policy for the KPA and its auxiliaries in the next 5 years and beyond.

In a historic first, a much longer military tattoo performance and drill show by massed military bands of the KPA, a drumline from the Concert Band and Symphony Orchestra of the SAC-DPRK and a guard of honor drill team company of the Supreme Guards Command preceded the parade. In particular, the Central Band of the KPA debuted a new dress blue uniform in the parade, with the winter version shown off to the audience.

As the parade was held in February, which is winter in the country, all of the troops wore winter gear, particularly few columns were shown wearing snow camouflage such as the 12th Corps, Sniper Column of GRIB and the Mountain Warfare Infantry, showing their capabilities in winter warfare. Alongside the conclusion of the Congress, it was also a belated celebration of the 78th Military Foundation Day earlier that month on the 8th.

Full Order of the 2026 Parade March Past was as follows:

- Honor Guards and Lifeguards Units
1. Honorary Cavalry Horse Guard Unit of the SAC (명예기병종대) (Note: Based on the appearance of the regimental colours leading the column, the battalion which formed the column were from the Party Central Committee 6th Bureau Cavalry (Workers' Party of Korea's Praetorian Guard) (조선로동당의 친위부대인 당중앙위원회 6처 기병대).)
2. Guard Office of the Party Central Committee (당중앙위원회 호위처종대)
3. Guard Department of the State Affairs Commission (국무위원회 경위국종대)
4. Security Department of the Party Central Committee (호위국종대)
5. Supreme Guard Command (호위사령부종대)
- Corps-level Units
1. First Corps (제1군단종대)
2. Second Corps (제2군단종대)
3. Fourth Corps (제4군단종대)
4. Fifth Corps (제5군단종대)
5. Navy (해군종대)
6. Air Force (공군종대)
7. Special Operations Forces (특수작전군종대)
8. Overseas Operation Units (해외작전부대종대)
9. Overseas Engineers Regiment (해외공병런대종대) (Note: Based on the speech given by Kim Jong Un at the welcoming ceremony for the returning KPA Overseas Engineers Unit in December 2025, the troops in this column may belong to the 528th Regiment of Engineers (제528공병련대).)
10. 91st Corps (제91군단종대)
11. Pyongyang Anti-aircraft Missile Corps (평양지구반항공미싸일사단종대)
12. 3rd Corps (제3군단종대)
13. 7th Corps (제7군단종대)
14. 8th Corps (제8군단종대)
15. 9th Corps (제9군단종대)
16. 10th Corps (제10군단종대)
17. 12th Corps (제12군단종대)
18. General Border Guards Bureau (국경경비총국종대)
19. Tank and Armoured Division (땅크장갑사단종대)
20. Seoul Ryu Kyong-Su 105th Guards Armored Division (근위 서울류경수제105땅크사단종대)
21. 425th Mechanized Infantry Division (제425기계화보병사단종대)
22. 108th Mechanized Infantry Division (제108기계화보병사단종대)
23. 815th Mechanized Infantry Division (제815기계화보병사단종대)
24. 806th Mechanized Infantry Division (제806기계화보병사단종대)
- Special Serviceperson Units (based on their specific capabilities)
1. Fire Power Attack Division (화력습격사단종대)
2. General Reconnaissance and Intelligence Bureau (정찰정보총국종대)
3. Composite Sniper Battalion of GRIB (저격수종대)
4. Mountain Warfare Infantry (산악보병종대)
5. Signalmen Battalion (통신병종대)
6. Combat Engineer Battalion (공병종대)
7. CBRN Warfare Column (화학병종대)
8. Electronic Warfare Unit (전자전병종대)
9. Medical Corps Battalion (군의 및 간호병종대)
10. Mountain Warfare in the Enemy Rear Unit (적후산 악활동부대종대)
11. Naval Snipers Unit (해상저격병부대종대) (Note: Based on the appearance of the regimental colours leading the column, the battalion that formed the column was from the 29th Sniper Brigade (제29저격병련단).)
12. Parachute Infantry Battalion (항공륙전병부대종대)
13. Seaborne Amphibious Assault Battalion (상륙돌격부대종대) (Note: Based on the appearance of the regimental colours leading the column, the battalion that formed the column was from the 118th Sniper Regiment (제118저격병련대), affiliated with the 41st Amphibious Shock Battalion.)
14. Transportation Operation Unit (수송작전부대종대)
- Universities and Military Schools at all levels
1. Kim Il Sung Military University (김일성군사종합대학종대)
2. Kim Jong Il University of Military Politics (김정일군정대학종대)
3. Kim Il Sung Political University (김일성정치대학종대)
4. Kang Kon Military Academy (강건명칭 종합군관학교종대)
- Law Enforcement Forces, Militia and Revolutionary Schools
1. Ministry of Social Security (사회안전성종대)
2. Special Task Force for Public Security (사회안전특별기동대종대)
3. Worker-Peasant Red Guards (로농적위군종대)
4. Students of Revolutionary Schools (혁명학원종대) (Note: Based on the appearance of the two regimental colours leading the column, the revolutionary school students who formed the column were from Red Flag Mangyongdae Revolutionary School (만경대혁명학원) and Chilgol Revolutionary School (칠골혁명학원) respectively.)

== See also ==
- Chinese National Day Parade
- Mongolian State Flag Day
- Victory Day Parades
