= First and second battles of Wonju =

1950–51 Korean War battles between North Korean and UN forces

First and Second Battles of Wonju
- Part of the Korean War
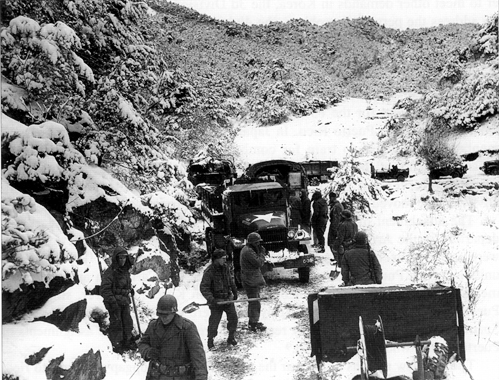
- US 2nd Infantry Division move through a mountain pass at the south of Wonju
| Date | December 31, 1950 – January 20, 1951 |
| Location | Wonju, South Korea 37°21′09″N 127°56′58″E |
| Result | United Nations victory |

Belligerents
| United Nations (UNC): France; Greece; Netherlands; United States; South Korea | China; North Korea |

Commanders and leaders
| (United States) Matthew B. Ridgway (United States) Edward Almond (First Republic of Korea) Lee Hyung Koon (First Republic of Korea) Yu Jae-hung (United States) Robert B. McClure (United States) Clark Ruffner (French Fourth Republic) Ralph Monclar (Netherlands) Marinus Petrus Antonius den Ouden (Kingdom of Greece) Dionysios Arbouzis | (China) Peng Dehuai (North Korea) Kim Ung (North Korea) Pak Il-u (North Korea) Ch'oe Hyon (North Korea) Pang Ho San |

Units involved
| (First Republic of Korea) II Corps (First Republic of Korea) III Corps (United States) X Corps: (United States) 1st Marine Division; (United States) 2nd Infantry Division; (United States) 7th Infantry Division; (United States) 187th Regimental Combat Team; (French Fourth Republic) French Battalion; (Netherlands) Dutch Battalion; (United States) 5th Cavalry Regiment (Kingdom of Greece) Greek Battalion | (North Korea) II Corps (North Korea) III Corps (North Korea) V Corps (China) 42nd Corps (Note: In Chinese military nomenclature, the term "Army" (军) means Corps, while the term "Army Group" (集团军) means Army.) (China) 66th Corps |

Strength
| US: 79,736 (Note: KATUSA numbers not included. See Appleman 1990, p. 40.); South Korea: Unknown | ~61,500 |

Casualties and losses
| (United States) ~600 dead (Note: This is the total casualty number of the US 2nd and 7th Infantry Division and the US 187th Regimental Combat Team from January 1 to January 24, 1951. The US 1st Marine Division and the US 1st Cavalry Division casualty number appears to be light. See Ecker 2005, pp. 73–75.) (French Fourth Republic) ~18 killed | ~18,000 (estimated) |
- Communist loses a net total of 3,900 km2 including the city of Sokcho, to South Korea

The First and Second Battles of Wonju (French: Bataille de Wonju), also known as the Wonju Campaign or the Third Phase Campaign Eastern Sector (Note: The Western Sector is the Third Battle of Seoul.) (Chinese: 第三次战役东线; pinyin: Dì Sān Cì Zhàn Yì Dōng Xiàn), was a series of engagements between North Korean and Republic of Korea Army (ROKA) and United Nations (UN) forces during the Korean War. The battle took place from December 31, 1950, to January 20, 1951, around the South Korean town of Wonju. In coordination with the Chinese capture of Seoul on the western front, the North Korean Korean People's Army (KPA) attempted to capture Wonju in an effort to destabilize the ROKA/UN defenses along the central and the eastern fronts.

After a joint Chinese People's Volunteer Army (PVA) and KPA assault breached the ROKA/UN defenses at Chuncheon on December 31, 1950, KPA V Corps attacked US X Corps at Wonju while KPA II Corps harassed US X Corps' rear by engaging in guerrilla warfare. In response, US X Corps under the command of Major general Edward Almond managed to cripple the KPA forces at Wonju, and the UN forces later carried out a number of anti-guerrilla operations against the KPA infiltrators. In the aftermath of the battle, the KPA forces on the central and the eastern fronts were decimated, allowing the UN front to be stabilized at the 37th parallel.

== Background ==
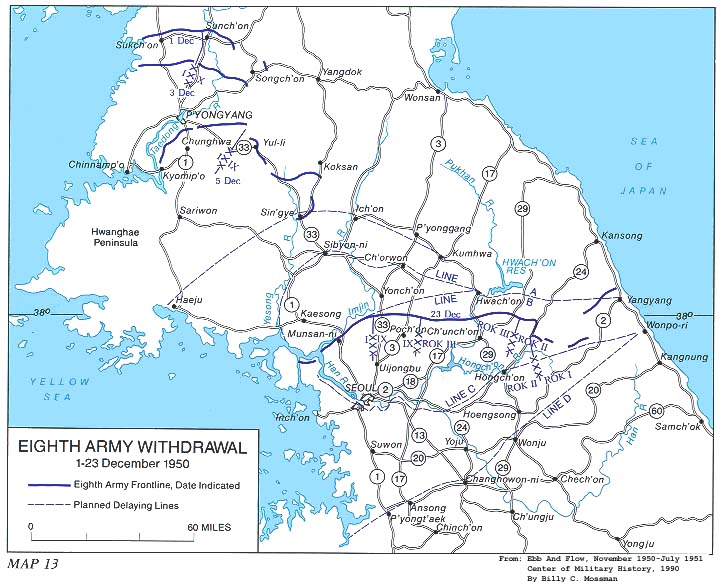
UN front line, December 1–23, 1950

After launching a surprise invasion of South Korea in June 1950, the KPA was shattered by the ROKA/UN forces following the landing at Incheon and the UN September 1950 counteroffensive, with the remnants of the KPA fleeing northward while seeking sanctuaries in the mountainous region along the Sino-Korean border. The destruction of the KPA and the UN offensive into North Korea prompted China to intervene in the Korean War, and Chinese forces launched their Second Phase Offensive against the ROKA/UN forces near the border during November 1950. The resulting battles in the Ch'ongch'on River valley and at Chosin Reservoir forced the ROKA/UN forces to retreat from North Korea during December 1950 to a line north of the 38th Parallel. On the eastern front, US X Corps had evacuated North Korea by sea by December 24, 1950. In its absence, the ROKA was forced to take over the defenses of the central and the eastern fronts along the 38th Parallel, including the important road junction of Wonju located near the central front. The sudden defeat of the ROKA/UN forces offered the decimated KPA a brief respite, and they rebuilt their strength at the end of 1950.

In the aftermath of the Chinese successes, Chinese Communist Party chairman Mao Zedong ordered another offensive against the ROKA/UN forces on the urging of North Korean Premier Kim Il Sung. The offensive, dubbed the "Third Phase Campaign", was an attack into South Korea that envisioned the total destruction of South Korean forces along the 38th parallel, and was aimed at pressuring the UN forces to withdraw from the Korean Peninsula. The western sector of the offensive was under the control of the PVA 13th Army, and the 13th Army's action would later result in capture of Seoul on January 4. With the PVA 9th Army decimated at the Chosin Reservoir, however, the eastern sector of the offensive was handed over to the rehabilitated KPA, under the overall command of Lieutenant general Kim Ung and Commissar Pak Il-u. On December 23, 1950, General Walton Walker, commander of the US Eighth Army, died in a traffic accident, and Lieutenant general Matthew B. Ridgway assumed command of the Eighth Army on December 26, 1950.

== Prelude ==
=== Locations, terrain and weather ===
The battle's main focus was around a road dubbed "Route 29", a strategically important line of communication to the ROKA/UN forces in central Korea. Wonju was a critical crossroad village on Route 29 which ran north to south and connects Chuncheon on the 38th Parallel with Taegu. Another road, which ran from the northwest, connected Route 29 and Seoul at Wonju. Between Chuncheon and Wonju stood the town of Hoengseong, and from Wonju to Taegu were a series of towns such as Chechon, Tanyang, Punggi and Andong. The entire road network was situated within the rough hilly terrains of the Taebaek Mountain Range. The fighting around Wonju occurred during some of the worst Korean winter conditions, with temperatures as low as −30 °F (−34 °C) and snow as thick as 14 in (36 cm) on the ground. Indeed, the weather was so cold that metal on artillery pieces would crack, while water could take an hour-and-a-half to boil. At times the cold weather alone was enough to stall all military activities, while frostbite caused more casualties than combat during the course of the battle.

=== Forces and strategy ===
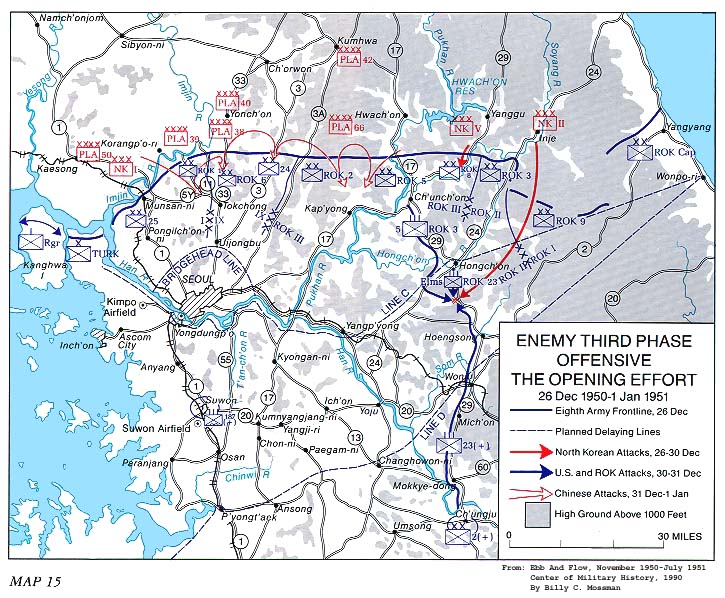
Map of the Chinese Third Phase Campaign

Just days before his death, Walker had tried to bolster the defences of the central and eastern sections of the 38th Parallel by stretching the ROKA forces from Chuncheon to the east coast. Following his instructions, ROKA III Corps was placed around Chuncheon while ROKA I Corps was deployed on the east coast. Meanwhile, ROKA II Corps, with its strength reduced to a single infantry division in the aftermath of the Ch'ongch'on River battle, filled the gap between I and III Corps. However, with the absence of US X Corps, the ROKA/UN defenses on the central and eastern fronts were stretched thin, and there were gaps between the understrength ROKA units. Because the ROKA forces had suffered nearly 45,000 casualties by the end of 1950, most of their units were composed of raw recruits with little training, and out of the four divisions that defended Chuncheon, only one was deemed battle worthy. Taking advantage of the situation, the KPA forces had been probing the ROKA lines since mid-December, while thousands of North Korean guerrillas harassed the ROKA/UN rear area from their mountain hideouts. On December 27, 1950, KPA II Corps managed to move behind the UN defenses by mauling the ROKA 9th Infantry Division on I Corps' left flank at Hyon-ri. This development threatened to destabilize the entire ROKA/UN eastern front.

In order to defend against the KPA penetration, Ridgway ordered US X Corps to reinforce the ROKA defenses. However, with most of US X Corps still assembling at Pusan, the only unit that was available in the Eighth Army's reserve was the US 2nd Infantry Division, which was still recovering from its earlier losses at the Ch'ongch'on River. On December 28, Ridgway ordered the division to defend Wonju while placing the division under US X Corps control. After the US 7th Infantry Division of US X Corps finished reorganization on December 30, Ridgway ordered Major general Edward Almond, commander of the US X Corps, to develop Route 29 as its main supply route, and the 7th Infantry Division was subsequently tasked with defending it.

In coordination with the Chinese assaults against Seoul in the western sector of the Third Phase Campaign, the North Koreans deployed the KPA II, III and V Corps, an estimated 61,500 soldiers, against the ROKA/UN forces on the central front. The KPA plan was a frontal attack at Wonju by Major general Pang Ho San's KPA V Corps, while Major general Ch'oe Hyon's KPA II Corps would infiltrate the US X Corps' rear as guerrillas and block Route 29. The aim of the offensive was to push US X Corps back in concert with the PVA attacks on Seoul, thereby isolating the ROKA forces in the Taebaek Mountains. As part of the attacks against Seoul, the PVA 42nd and 66th Corps were deployed near Chuncheon in support of KPA V Corps during the opening phase of the battle. Meanwhile, KPA III Corps would act as reinforcements for KPA II and V Corps. However, like the ROKA they were facing, the KPA forces were also badly depleted and understrength. Although the KPA fielded more than 10 infantry divisions for the battle, most were only equivalent in strength to an infantry regiment. In contrast with the professional mechanized army that had existed at the start of the Korean War, the newly rebuilt KPA formations were poorly trained and armed. Nevertheless, the start date of the Third Phase Campaign was set for New Year's Eve in order to take advantage of the full moon and the low alertness of the UN soldiers during the holiday.

== First Battle of Wonju ==
=== Opening moves ===
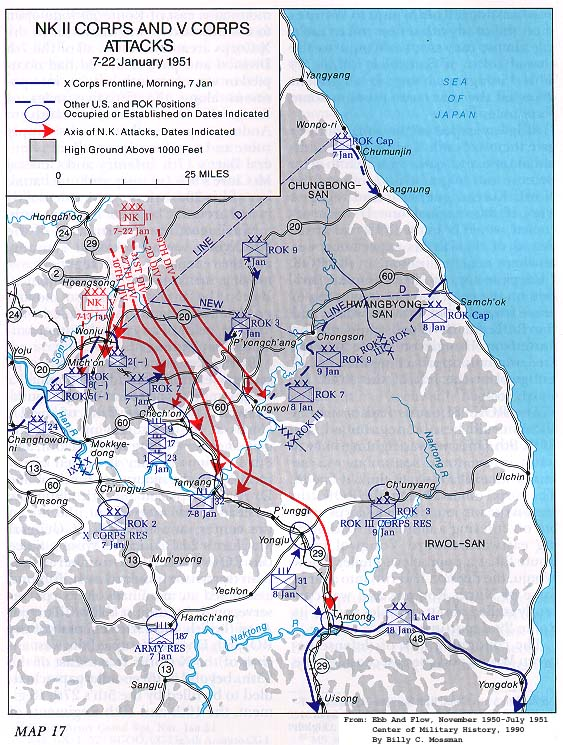
Map of the North Korean offensive

On the central front, ROKA III Corps defended the 38th parallel north of Gapyeong (Kapyong) and Chuncheon. Composed of the 2nd, 5th, 7th and 8th Infantry Divisions, III Corps placed the 2nd Infantry Division on the corps' left flank in the hills north of Gapyeong, while the 5th Infantry Division defended the corps' center at Chuncheon. The winter conditions created great difficulties for the South Korean defenders, with the heavy snow hindering construction and icy roads limiting food and ammunition resupply. North Korean guerrillas were also active in the region, and caused serious disruption in the rear of the ROKA III Corps.

As part of the Chinese plan to capture Seoul, the PVA 42nd and the 66th Corps were tasked with protecting the PVA left flank by eliminating the ROKA 2nd and 5th Infantry Divisions, while cutting the road between Chuncheon and Seoul. Following instructions, the two Chinese corps struck quickly after midnight on New Year's Eve. The PVA 124th Division first penetrated the flanks of the 2nd Infantry Division, then blocked the division's withdrawal route. The trapped 17th and 32nd Regiments, 2nd Infantry Division were then forced to retreat in disarray. With the PVA 66th Corps pressuring the 5th Infantry Division's front, the PVA 124th Division then advanced eastward in the rear and blocked the 5th Infantry Division's retreat route as well. The maneuver soon left the 36th Regiment, 5th Infantry Division surrounded by PVA and they had to escape by infiltrating the PVA lines using mountain trails. By January 1, ROKA III Corps was in full retreat, while the Corps' headquarters had lost contact with the 2nd and 5th Infantry Divisions. Responding to the crisis on the central front, ROKA III Corps sector's defense was handed over to US X Corps.

While the PVA were making a concentrated attack against the ROKA front, the KPA forces that had infiltrated the ROKA/UN rear were cutting the ROKA withdrawal route. In the days before the Chinese Third Phase Campaign, KPA II Corps established a major roadblock to the north of Hoengsong with an estimated strength of 10,000 soldiers, which blocked the retreat of ROKA III Corps. In response, ROKA II Corps and the US 2nd Infantry Division conducted a siege operation against the roadblock from both the north and the south, and the roadblock was forced open by January 2. Although the ROKA/UN forces managed to eliminate a KPA division at the roadblock, ROKA II Corps was nearly destroyed during the fighting, and it was disbanded on January 10.

The success of the initial PVA/KPA attacks forced ROKA I Corps to abandon its attempts to restore its original defensive position at Hyon-ri, and a large number of KPA soon streamed into the gap between the US 2nd Infantry Division at Wonju and ROKA I Corps on the east coast. Ridgway interpreted the attack on the central front as an attempt to surround the UN defenders at Seoul, and he immediately ordered their evacuation on January 3. On January 5, Ridgway ordered all ROKA/UN forces to withdraw to the 37th parallel to set up a new defensive line, dubbed Line D, with the ROKA/UN forces on central and eastern fronts setting up defenses between Wonju and the coastal city of Jumunjin (Chumunjin). At the same time, the PVA troops halted their offensive operations with KPA II and V Corps relieving the PVA 42nd and 66th Corps.

=== Wonju falls ===
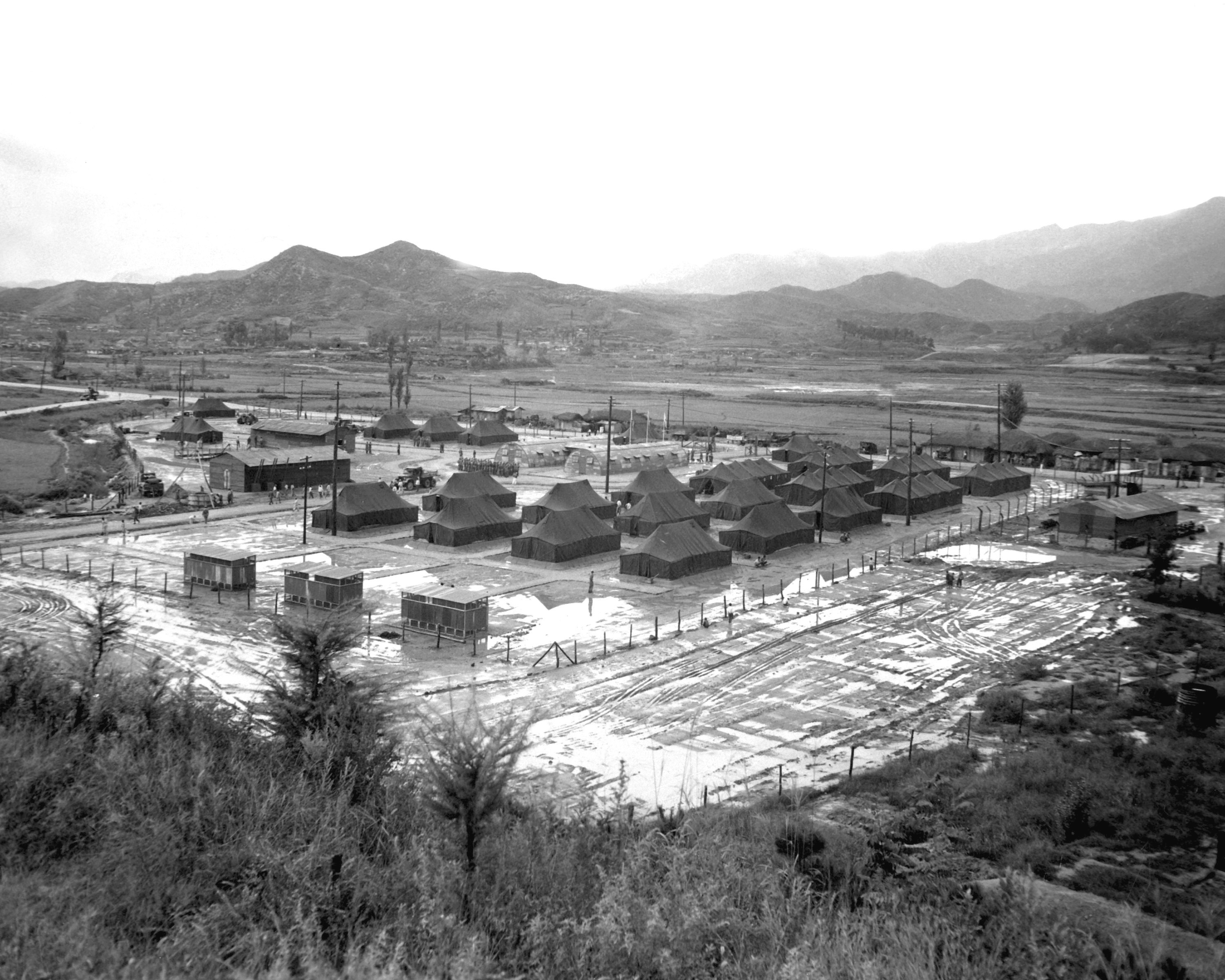
Wonju, September 1951

In the aftermath of the ROKA collapse, KPA V Corps proceeded to launch frontal attacks against US X Corps while KPA II Corps infiltrated the ROKA/UN rear through the area to the east of Wonju. The US 2nd Infantry Division's position had now become an exposed northern salient, and its defenses were further hampered by the flat terrain surrounding Wonju. However, given the strategic importance of Wonju in controlling central Korea, Ridgway declared that the village was "only second to Seoul" in importance, and therefore must be defended at all cost. In accordance with Ridgway's instructions, Almond ordered the division to defend the hills north of Wonju, yet division commander Major general Robert B. McClure believed that the salient was untenable due to the terrain and the low morale of his division. On January 7, two infantry battalions from KPA V Corps launched an attack against the division. One KPA battalion managed to infiltrate the American positions disguised as refugees while another battalion launched a frontal assault. Yet the weak attack was soon repulsed due to the lack of coordination between the KPA units, and about 114 infiltrators were later captured. Although the KPA attack inflicted little damage, the disruption caused by infiltrators in the division's rear convinced McClure to abandon Wonju on January 7. Almond concurred with McClure's decision on the condition that the division would only retreat 3 miles (4.8 km) so that Wonju could be controlled by UN artillery fire. Regardless, McClure ordered the division to retreat more than 8 miles (13 km) south, putting the village out of artillery range. With Wonju under KPA control, the PVA declared that the Third Phase Campaign had reached a successful conclusion.

== Second Battle of Wonju ==
=== Hill 247 ===
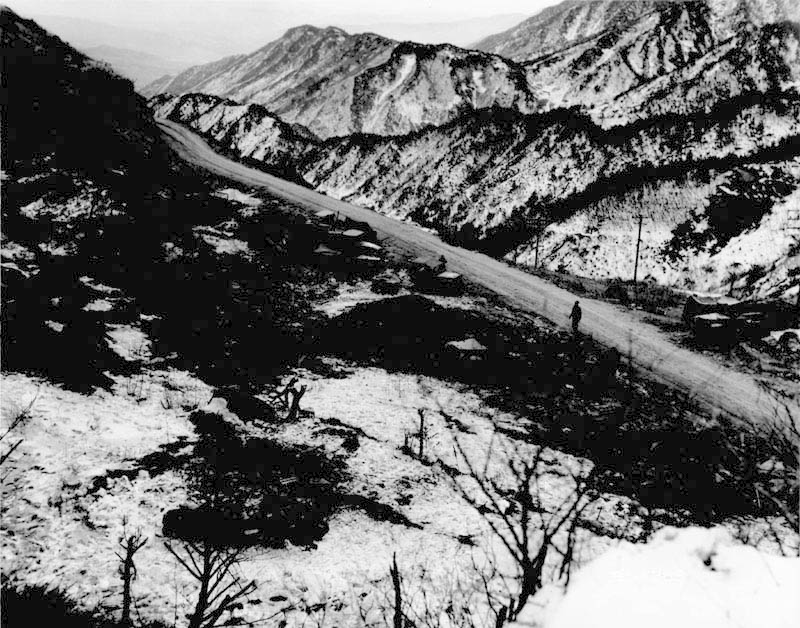
Soldiers from US 7th Infantry Division moving to blast North Korean positions along Route 29

Hill 247 was located among the hill mass 3 mi (4.8 km) south of Wonju, and was a critical height that commanded Wonju. With the loss of Wonju on January 7, Almond was furious at McClure for disobeying the order to hold it, and this later resulted in Major general Clark Ruffner replacing McClure on January 13. On January 8, Almond ordered the division to retake Wonju. Following his orders, the US 23rd Infantry Regiment, under the command of Colonel Paul L. Freeman, attacked towards Wonju on January 8. The 23rd Infantry Regiment managed to reach within 3,000 yd (2,700 m) at the south of Wonju and caught a sleeping KPA regiment by surprise at Hill 247. About 200 KPA soldiers were killed in the ensuing battle, however the alerted KPA forces soon counterattacked by outflanking the 23rd Infantry Regiment to the east, and the Regiment was forced to retreat to avoid encirclement.

Encouraged by the heavy KPA losses during the initial UN attacks, Almond again ordered the division to recapture Wonju on January 9. About four infantry battalions from the US 23rd and 38th Infantry Regiments supported by French and Dutch troops advanced toward Wonju on January 9, yet the attack was stalled at Hill 247 due to the cold weather and the lack of air support. As the UN forces tried to dislodge the KPA the next day, they were met by six defending KPA battalions with an estimated strength of 7,000 soldiers. Under a heavy snowstorm and with no air support, the battle for Hill 247 continued for most of January 10, and the fighting around the French Battalion of the 23rd Infantry Regiment became particularly fierce. At one point, the French Battalion was forced to fend off several KPA counterattacks with bayonet charges after running out of ammunition. The French Battalion's action at Wonju impressed Ridgway, who later encouraged all American units in Korea to utilize bayonets in battle. The KPA tried to encircle the attacking UN forces as the latter began to gain the upper hand, however artillery fire broke up the KPA formations, and they had suffered an estimated 2,000 casualties in the aftermath of the battle. When air support returned on January 11, the attacking UN forces inflicted another 1,100 KPA casualties and captured Hill 247 by January 12. Although the cold weather and the stubborn KPA defenses prevented the UN forces from entering Wonju, the capture of Hill 247 had put all of Wonju within UN artillery range, and the village soon became a no man's land under the devastating bombardment.

=== Anti-guerrilla operations ===
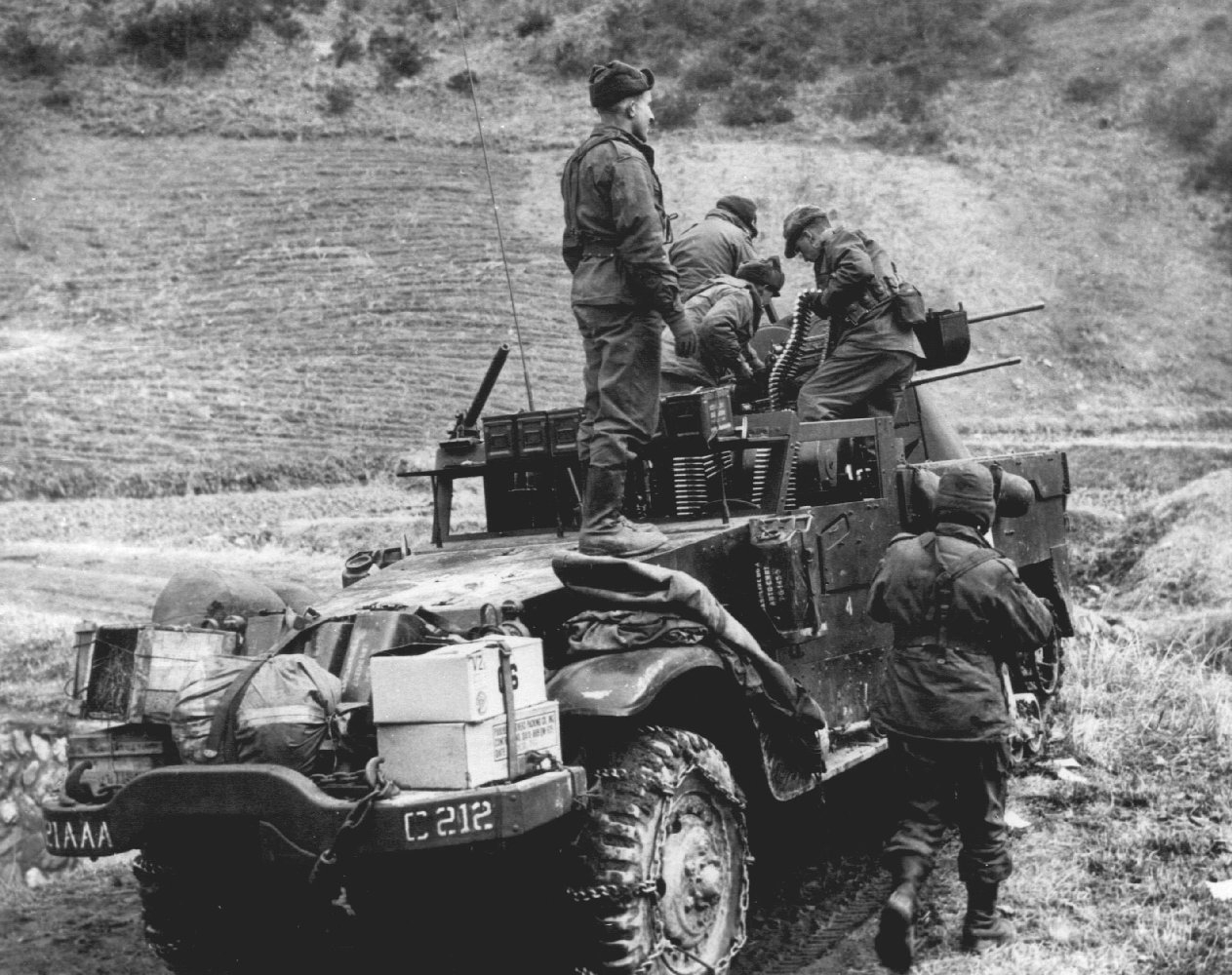
An M16 Multiple Gun Motor Carriage in Korea. Firepower provided by anti-aircraft vehicles such as this one had proven to be invaluable in patrol actions against North Korean guerrillas.

Although the capture of Hill 247 had forced KPA V Corps to abandon Wonju with heavy losses on January 17, KPA II Corps' infiltration in the ROKA/UN rear area had become so serious that it threatened to outflank the entire ROKA/UN front and force a complete evacuation of Korea by mid-January. With the bulk of US X Corps tied up to the south of Wonju while ROKA III Corps was in disarray, the front between Wonju and the east coast was undefended, and about 16,000 KPA soldiers entered the gap while establishing guerrilla bases from Tanyang to Andong. The battles along the central front soon degenerated into irregular warfare between company-sized UN patrols and KPA guerrilla bands. In an effort to stabilize the front, Ridgway ordered the US 2nd Infantry Division to withdraw from Wonju while pulling the central and eastern fronts back to the area between Wonju and Samch'ok, and this resulted in another 40 mi (64 km) retreat. Ridgway also sent the US 187th Regimental Combat Team, the US 5th Cavalry Regiment, the US 1st Marine Division and the Greek Battalion to contain KPA guerrillas east of Route 29 and north of Andong and Yeongdeok. About 30,000 American infantry were deployed to the central front by mid-January, and the KPA guerrillas were blocked in a narrow salient along the hills at the east of Route 29.

To eliminate the KPA threat in the UN rear, Almond ordered all X Corps units on Route 29 to launch aggressive patrols to destroy the KPA supply bases and guerrilla bands. Specially trained irregular forces, such as X Corps' Special Action Group, also hunted KPA units by operating as guerrillas themselves. The constant UN pressure slowly depleted the ammunition and the manpower of KPA II Corps, while Major general Yu Jae-hung rallied ROKA III Corps and sealed the gap between Wonju and the east coast by January 22. On January 20, a patrol carried out by the US 9th Infantry Regiment, 2nd Infantry Division managed to reoccupy Wonju without much resistance. Lacking reinforcements and supplies, KPA II Corps was scattered by the end of January, and only 8,600 soldiers from KPA II Corps managed to survive and retreat back to North Korea. The KPA 10th Division, vanguard of KPA II Corps, was also annihilated by US 1st Marine Division during the UN anti-guerrilla operations.

== Aftermath ==
By the end of January, KPA II Corps was decimated during its guerrilla operations, and its estimated strength was reduced from 16,000 to 8,000. KPA V Corps' attempt to capture Wonju had also resulted in crippling casualties, and its estimated strength was reduced from 32,000 to 22,000 by the end of January. In contrast, UN losses were relatively moderate during the same period. (Note: Although the unit-by-unit casualty data provided by Ecker suggested the US casualty number was around 600, the extent of the ROKA losses is unknown due to the lack of records. See Appleman 1989, p. 403.) The defeat of the KPA enabled the UN forces to consolidate their positions along the Korean central and eastern front, and the retreating US Eighth Army on the Korean western front could finally return to the offensive after its rear and eastern flank were secured. As soon as US X Corps regained full control of the central front at the end of January, Ridgway ordered the US Eighth Army to launch Operation Thunderbolt against PVA/KPA forces on January 25, 1951.

== Notes ==
Footnotes

Citations
