= Korean People's Army Ground Force =

Land warfare branch of North Korea's military

- 조선인민군 륙군
- Patch of the Korean People's Army Ground Force
- Founded: 20 August 1947; 79 years ago
- Country: North Korea
- Type: Army
- Size: 950,000 active personnel 420,000 reserve personnel
- Part of: Korean People's Army
- March: "Song of the Korean People's Army"
- Equipment: 5,545 tanks; 2,500 infantry fighting vehicles; 10,000 artillery pieces; 5,500 multiple rocket launcher systems
- Engagements: Korean War; Korean conflict Russo-Ukrainian war

Commanders
- Supreme Commander: Supreme Leader Kim Jong-un
- Chief of the General Staff: Vice Marshal Ri Yong-gil
- Notable commanders: Choi Yong-kun; Kim Chaek
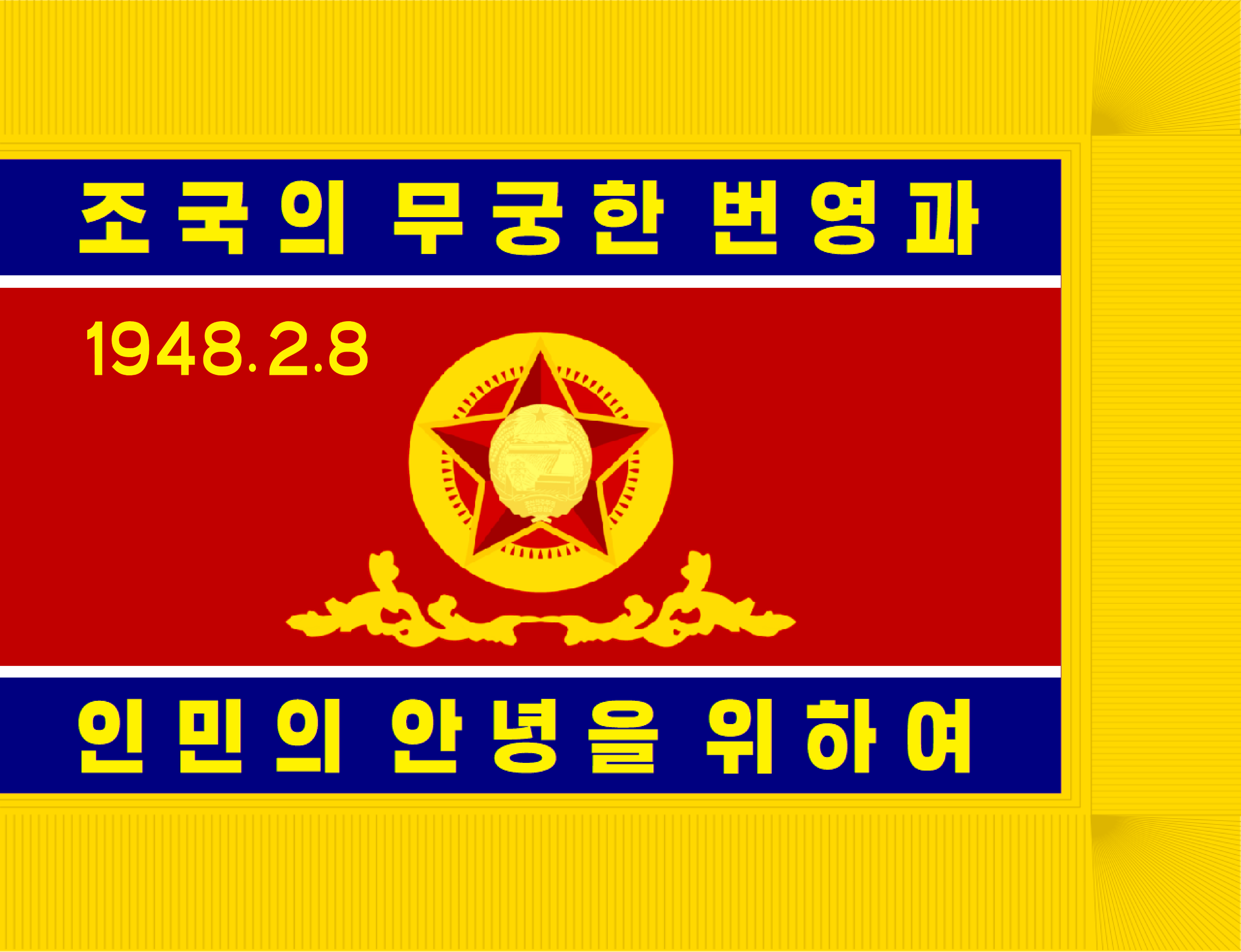
- Flag: Front: Back:

Korean name
- Hangul: 조선인민군 륙군
- Hanja: 朝鮮人民軍陸軍
- RR: Joseon inmingun ryukgun
- MR: Chosŏn inmin'gun ryukkun

The Korean People's Army Ground Force (KPAGF; Korean: 조선인민군 륙군; MR: chosŏninmin'gun ryukkun; lit. 'Korean People's Military Army') is the main branch of the Korean People's Army, responsible for land-based military operations.

== History ==
The Korean People's Army Ground Force was formed on August 20, 1947. It outnumbered and outgunned the South Korean army at the outbreak of the Korean War in June 1950 before being pushed back by a combined United Nations-Republic of Korea counteroffensive. North Korean ground forces formations which fought in the Korean War included the I Corps, the II and III Corps. The IV Corps and V Corps, VI and VII Corps were formed after the outbreak of war. Divisions included the 105th Armored Division, the 1st, 2nd, 3rd, 4th, 5th, 6th, 7th, 8th, 9th, 10th, 12th, 19th, and 43rd Infantry Divisions. During the Korean War, it also contained a number of independent units such as the 766th Infantry Regiment.

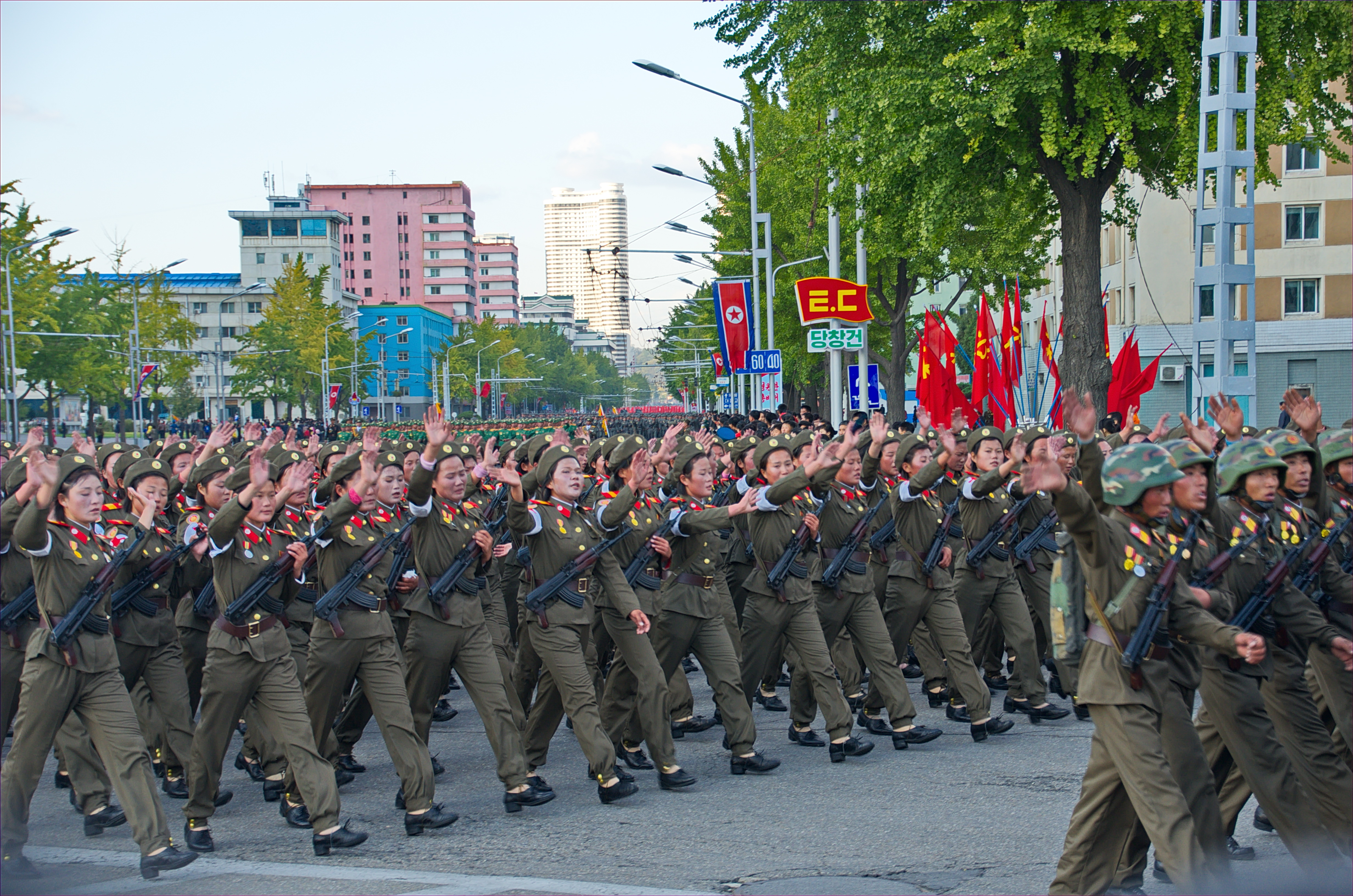
A military parade in Pyongyang, 2015

In 1960, the KPAGF may have totalled fewer than 400,000 personnel and probably did not rise much above that figure before 1972. The force then massively expanded over the next two decades. In 1992, there were 950,000 personnel. Before this expansion of the North Korean ground forces, the South Korean army outnumbered the KPAGF. From the 1970s on, South Korea started exceeding North Korea in terms of economics. Thus, South Korea could modernize its forces, which in turn alerted North Korea and resulted in the expansion of the North Korean armed forces. The weaker of the two Koreas has maintained the larger armed force. The size, organization, disposition, and combat capabilities of the Ground Force give Pyongyang military, albeit technologically inferior, possible options both for limited offensive operations to assault the lower half of the peninsula or for limited defensive operations against any perceived threat from South Korea.

Scalapino and Lee's Communism in Korea: The Society gave an organisation chart in 1972 that showed the 1st, 2nd, 3rd, 5th, and 7th Army Groups (p. 940). The 1st, 2nd (five divs), and 5th had four divisions plus a brigade or regiment; the 3rd had four divisions, and the 7th three divisions and three brigades. Scalapino and Lee drew upon the South Korean-published The North Korean Yearbook. A declassified 1971 CIA document referring to a 1970 DIA assessment appears to indicate that the 1st Army Group included the 13th and 47th Infantry Divisions.

Yossef Bodansky's Crisis in Korea gives an account of the North Korean order of battle in 1984–88. The 1st, 2nd (five divs, one brigade), and 5th Army Groups, each with four divisions and one independent brigade, covered the eastern, Western, and central sectors of the DMZ. The III, VI, and VII Corps were deployed around Wonsan and the coastal regions, with the IV Corps, recently converted from the 4th Army Group, around Pyongyang. All the corps had the virtually-standard four divisions and an independent brigade under command, apart from the VII Corps with three divisions and three brigades. The army groups were described as striking forces while the corps also had ground-holding responsibilities. The III, VI, and VII Corps began forming armoured and mechanised units in 1985.

Over time, this organization has adjusted to the unique circumstances of the military problem the KPA faces and to the evolution of North Korean military doctrine and thought.

In 1996, a significant portion of the staff, along with local government officials of the VI Corps was arrested and convicted of bribery and corruption. The VI Corps HQ, which was in Chongjin, was in charge of military activities in the whole of North Hamgyong Province. It consisted of three infantry divisions, four rocket brigades and one artillery division. Joseph F. Bermudez reports in Shield of the Great Leader that the incident was not a coup, but it is often reported as such. In any event, the corps was disbanded, and its units reallocated elsewhere, some to the IX Corps in North Hamgyong Province. The IX Corps now includes the 24th Division and the 42nd Division.

=== Twenty-first century ===
In 2003 it was reported that the overwhelming majority of active ground forces were deployed in three echelons — a forward operational echelon of four infantry corps; supported by a second operational echelon of two mechanized corps, the armor corps, and an artillery corps; and a strategic reserve of the two remaining mechanized corps and the other artillery corps. These forces include the 806th and 815th Mechanised Corps and the 820th Armoured Corps. These forces were garrisoned along major north–south lines of communication that provide rapid, easy access to avenues of approach into South Korea. The KPAGF has positioned massive numbers of artillery pieces, especially its longer-range systems, close to the Demilitarized Zone (DMZ) that separates the two Koreas.

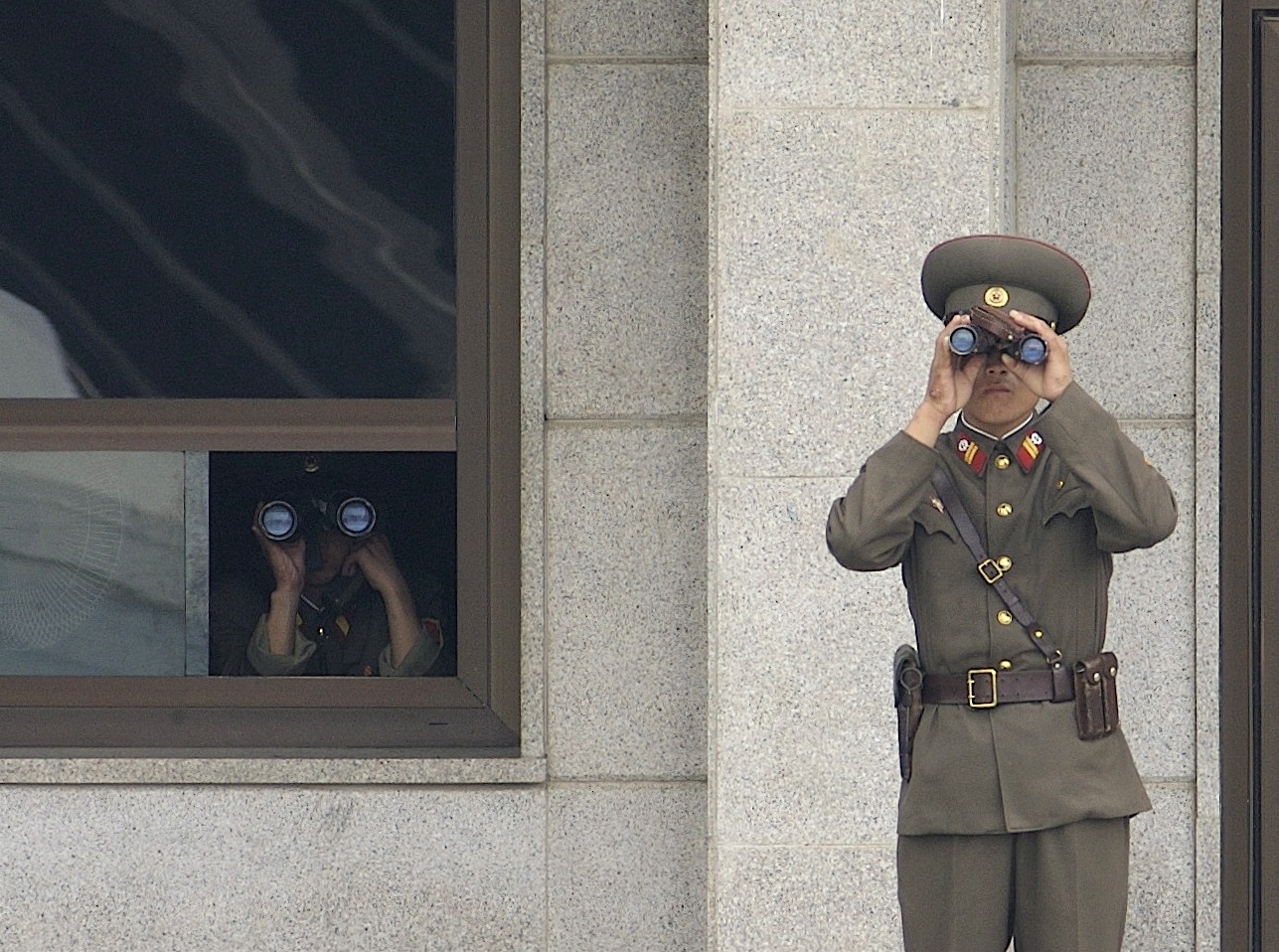
North Korean soldiers at the DMZ

As of 2013, the US Department of Defense reported the ground forces in number totals 950,000 in strength.

The IISS Military Balance 2017 listed the KPA GF as comprising an estimated 1,020,000 personnel; two mechanised corps headquarters (HQs); 9 infantry corps HQ; the Pyongyang Defense Command HQ; one armoured division [the 105th]; fifteen armoured brigades; four mechanised divisions; 27 infantry divisions; 14 infantry brigades; two surface-to-surface missile brigades; one artillery division; 21 artillery brigades; 9 multiple rocket launcher brigades; one engineer river crossing brigade; and 5-8 engineer river crossing regiments (p. 304).

Kyle Mizokami wrote in February 2020 that the 820th Armoured Corps was made up of two armoured brigades and five mechanised brigades, and likely only to be "partially equipped" with the Pokpung-ho tank. In March 2020 the "..820th Corps (820th Training Center).." was described as a "..tank corps or an armoured corps. Headquartered in Sariwon, Hwanghae Province, the 820th Corps' mission is to break through to the Korean rear at high speed during wartime." "..the ROK and US military authorities presume that [the 820th Corps has] a number of armoured and mechanized infantry brigades in addition to the 105th Division. The main force of this corps is the Cheonma-ho, a tank produced by North Korea itself."

The KPA reorganizes its ground forces every so often, so some corps-level units (particularly mechanized or armoured units) will revert to division-level units, and certain divisions will become corps-level units. There are reports that the 620th Artillery Corps has been reorganised as the 518th Artillery Division.

== Equipment ==
The Ground Forces have a mix of domestic and imported equipment in their inventory. Prior to the breakup of the Soviet Union, most of these items were Soviet made and later, from China.

The annual report of North Korea's military capabilities by the U.S. Department of Defense, released in early 2014, identified the North Korean Army's strength at 950,000 personnel, 4,200 tanks, 2,200 armored vehicles, 8,600 artillery guns, and over 4,800 multiple rocket launchers. The bi-annual report of North Korea's military capabilities by the ROK's Ministry of National Defense, released in 2018, identified the North Korean Army's strength at 7,620,000 reserves troops, 4,300 tanks, 2,500 armored vehicles, 8,600 artillery guns, 5,500 multiple rocket launchers.

Crucially, the North Korean Army has large numbers of heavy artillery in positions close to the DMZ and near Seoul, the capital of South Korea, a city having a population of approximately 25 million people, around 50% of the total population of South Korea. These artillery pieces can reach the northern parts of Seoul, and are often considered to be a more significant threat than North Korea's nuclear weapons. North Korea's threat of a 'sea of fire' upon Seoul is usually taken to refer to the use of this artillery.

Studies have differed over the number of casualties these artillery can inflict; one 2011 study suggests that the North Korean artillery, firing so as to cause maximum civilian casualties instead of for military effect, could inflict "only" about 3,000 – 30,000 casualties in the first day of a conflict, after which the population would evacuate or find shelter and the North Korean artillery pieces were themselves substantially destroyed.

In South Korea, many of North Korean small arms are showcased in many war museums, such as War Memorial of Korea, tourist sites of North Korean infiltration tunnels, or for the purpose of inspiring patriotism to citizens. The Korean Defense Intelligence Command (KDIC) displays North Korean equipment (most of them used by Special Forces) on an exhibition van in various military-related events place such as military units or public establishments.

== Ranks and uniforms ==
=== Ranks ===
Korean People's Army Ground Forces has six categories of ranks; marshals (-Su), general officers (-Jang), senior officers (-Jwa, "Commanders"), junior officers (-Wī, "Leaders"), Non-commissioned officers (-Sa), and soldiers (-Pyŏngsa, "Soldier" and -Chŏnsa, "Warrior").

==== Officers ====
Rank group	General / flag officers						Senior officers				Junior officers
Korean People's Army Ground Force
Korean People's Army Ground Force	인민군원수; Inmingun-wonsu	차수; Chasu	대장; Daejang	상장; Sangjang	중장; Chungjang	소장; Sojang	대좌; Daechwa	상좌; Sangjwa	중좌; Chungjwa	소좌; Sojwa	대위; Taewi	상위; Sangwi	중위; Chungwi	소위; Sowi

Vice Marshal and above ranks wear Ground Force uniforms regardless of service branch as there is no branch division after this rank.

==== Enlisted ====
Rank group	Senior NCOs					Junior NCOs		Enlisted
Korean People's Army Ground Force
Korean People's Army Ground Force	특무상사; T'ŭkmu-sangsa	상사; Sangsa	중사; Chungsa	하사; Hasa	상급병사; Sanggŭp-pyŏngsa	중급병사; Chungŭp-pyŏngsa	하급병사; Hagŭp-pyŏngsa	전사; Chŏnsa

=== Uniform ===
KPA officers and soldiers are most often seen wearing a mix of olive green or tan uniforms. The basic dress uniform consists of a tunic and pants (white tunics for general officers in special occasions); female soldiers wear knee length skirts but can sometimes wear pants.

Caps or peaked caps, especially for officers (and sometimes berets for women) are worn in spring and summer months and a Russian style fur hat (the Ushanka hats) in winter. A variant of the Disruptive Pattern Material, the Disruptive Pattern Combat Uniform (green), the ERDL pattern, the M81 Woodland—or even South Korean version, Tonghab (통합)—and the Tigerstripe is also being worn in a few rare images of North Korean army officers and service personnel. In Non-Dress uniforms, a steel helmet (The DPRK produced Type 40 helmet, a copy of the Soviet SSh 40, see Soviet helmets during World War II) seems to be the most common headgear, and is sometimes worn with a camouflage covering.

Standard military boots are worn for combat, women wear low heel shoes or heel boots for formal parades. Some male troops may also wear knee-high boots, reserved for the guard of honour in ceremonies such as welcoming the supreme leader Kim Jong-Un and foreign dignatries, as well as formal parades, often making the pants "baggier".

Camouflage uniforms are slowly becoming more common in the KPA. During the April 15, 2012 parade, Kevlar helmets were displayed in certain KPA units and similar helmets are currently used by KPA special operations forces.

During the parade on 10 October 2020, a range of at least 5 new pixelated camouflage patterns and new soldiers’ combat gear of all branches, including the North Korea People's Ground Forces were shown for the first time. Even though it was difficult to tell the patterns apart from each other, two different green based designs, an arid camouflage design, blue camouflage design, and a two-color pixelated camouflage pattern for mountain and winter warfare were all observed. Also, the use of Multicam pattern uniforms by North Korean military personnel was first documented in 2020 during the same parade, although uniforms in this design may well have appeared in the armed forces inventory much earlier.

During the parade on January 14, 2021, the Korea People's Army Ground Forces wore digital camouflage uniforms and combat boots similar to the desert-colored combat boots that the Republic of Korea Army recently began issuing. The shape and material of the pockets match the initial type and became more similar to ROK Armed Forces standard camouflage uniform, and the pattern is also in the form of a color inversion. There was also an article that said some Korean-Chinese merchants were involved in leaking Korean military camouflage patterns. However, until first quarter of 2022, these camouflage been provided to strategic forces and military parade units actively mobilized for propaganda.

In 2026, North Korean military wore digital camouflage uniform, similar to Granite B and EMR camouflage.

== See also ==
- Republic of Korea Army
- Korean People's Army
- Korean People's Navy
- Korean People's Army Air and Anti-Air Force
- Korean People's Army Special Operations Forces
- Korean People's Army Strategic Force
- Worker-Peasant Red Guards
