= VI Corps (North Korea) =

Former corps of the North Korean army

- Active: 1950–1951; 1953–mid-1990s
- Country: North Korea
- Branch: Korean People's Army Ground Force
- Type: Infantry; Mechanized; Artillery; Rocketry
- Size: 35,500 infantry (1951)
- Engagements: Korean War; Sixth Army Corps incident

The VI Corps was a corps of the North Korean People's Army. It took part in the Korean War and was one of the units withdrawn to China in Autumn 1950 for training and reorganisation. It returned to Korea in 1951, as one of only three full strength corps in the North Korean Army. It was inactivated towards the end of the war but was reactivated some time afterwards. By the 1990s the corps was stationed in North Hamgyong Province, on the border with China. It is alleged that senior leaders in the corps were planning a coup against the North Korean government during the 1994–1998 famine. The government is said to have detected the coup and moved to arrest and execute many of its leaders. The VI Corps was later dismantled and some of its troops incorporated into the IX Corps.

== Korean War ==
The VI Corps fought in the Korean War and was one of the units withdrawn to Chinese Manchuria in autumn 1950, ahead of the UN offensive into North Korea. After reorganisation and retraining the VI Corps returned to northern Korea in January 1951. The corps, consisting of the 18th, 19th and 36th Infantry Divisions travelled south, avoiding the main Route 1 and using minor roads to avoid detection by United Nations forces. The corps, at this time under the command of Lieutenant-General Choe Yong Jin was in position north-west of Seoul by mid-February.

The presence of the corps was detected by the Eighth United States Army by 1 March, though they remained unaware of the movements of the VII and VIII Corps, which had accompanied the VI Corps southwards. On 16 May 1951 the 9th Infantry Division was attached to the corps and held a defensive position at Yonan until August when it was moved east to Kosang.

The Eighth Army assessed the strength of VI Corps on 1 July 1951 as 35,500 men and thought that it consisted of the 9th, 18th and 23rd Infantry Divisions as well as the 17th Mechanized Division (the only one of its kind in the North Korean army at this time). The VI Corps was one of only three in the whole North Korean Army at close to full strength in this period. The 18th Division was on coastal defence duty on the east coast until November 1951. VI Corps was inactivated sometime between 1951 and 1953, but was reactivated after the war.

== Alleged 1990s coup attempt and disbandment ==
There are several reports of the corps being involved in a coup attempt in the 1990s; the BBC notes that details are unclear, but some sort of incident is likely to have taken place. North Korea was, at this time, suffering from the withdrawal of Soviet funding following the collapse of the Soviet Union. This led to a reduction in North Korean industrial exports, and a resultant lack of finance led to the North Korean famine of 1994–1998. The death of Kim Il Sung in 1994 and the accession of Kim Jong Il led to political instability, which may have been perceived as an opportunity by plotters.

The VI Corps was stationed at Chongjin, North Hamgyong Province as a rear echelon infantry corps of three infantry divisions, one artillery division and four rocket brigades. The corps was closely involved in monitoring the cross-border trade with China and may have incurred the displeasure of the national government by taking too large a cut of illicit trade.

North Korea analysts Victor Cha and Nicholas Anderson state that the leadership of the VI Corps was angered by a decision from the national government not to send food to the Hamgyong provinces. Writer Kim So Yeol states that the corps' political committees, battalion commanders were involved in planning the coup, and civilian administrators in the province were also implicated, including the chief secretary of the province and vice directors of intelligence and social security agencies. The coup allegedly failed after an agreement could not be reached between the corps commander and the senior political and security officers. This is an intentional arrangement of North Korean military formations to prevent individuals holding sole power over their movements. If the coup had proceeded, Cha and Anderson claim the intention was to take over the Chongjin port, a university, communications centre and missile installations, before linking up with the neighbouring VII Corps (which had also been linked to a coup attempt in 1993) and moving to Pyongyang to oppose the government.

The coup was discovered before it was carried out and completely dismantled. Kim Jong Il's brother-in-law led a military unit to arrest the corps' leaders, which was carried out after a firefight with the plotters. Kim So Yeol states that 40 were executed and 300 otherwise punished, other reports state that scores of officers were executed by machine gun or being sealed into their headquarters which were then set alight. Former Central Intelligence Agency agent Michael Yi says that 400 corps officers and their families were arrested. The VI Corps was subsequently dismantled and its troops incorporated into IX Corps, as the state attempted to hide the coup from the public.

Sources differ on the timing of the coup and its extent. Armin Rosen of Business Insider claims it occurred in Spring 1995, Kim So Yeol states it was in 1996 and Andrew Salmon of the Daily Telegraph gives 1997. Barbara Demick of the Los Angeles Times states that a coup was unlikely to have taken place, though it is widely believed to have taken place by North Korea citizens.
