= Sixth Army Corps incident =

Military purge in North Korea (1995)

The Sixth Army Corps incident (also referred to as the No. 6 Corps incident) was a large-scale purge of the Korean People's Army's VI Corps in North Hamgyong Province, North Korea, carried out in either 1995 or 1996. The incident occurred during a period of severe national crisis for North Korea: the country was experiencing a famine that would ultimately claim hundreds of thousands of lives, founding leader Kim Il-sung had died in 1994, and his son Kim Jong-il was still consolidating power. Accounts of the event differ, but it is generally agreed that a substantial number of officers were executed, the corps was disbanded, and its divisions were reassigned. While some sources describe a planned coup d'état that was foiled before it could be executed, others attribute the purge to the corps' unauthorized economic activities along the Chinese border.

== Background ==
North Hamgyong Province (red), where the VI Corps was headquartered in Chongjin.

By the mid‑1990s the North Korean state was facing several overlapping catastrophes. The end of Cold War‑era subsidies from the Soviet Union had crippled the industrial economy, and deepening food shortages led to the "Arduous March" famine (1994–1999). The death of Kim Il-sung in July 1994 removed a central pillar of regime legitimacy, and his son Kim Jong-il, although long designated as successor, was seen by outside observers as untested and appeared vulnerable, with many experts predicting that the regime could not survive. The VI Corps, headquartered in the port city of Chongjin, was one of the country's major regular army corps and was responsible for the whole of North Hamgyong Province. The corps was also reported to profit from informal trade across the nearby Chinese border. The unit comprised three infantry divisions, four rocket brigades and an artillery division.

Kim Jong-il had previously shown his willingness to use purges to eliminate perceived threats against his rule and authority. In 1992, the year after he became supreme commander of the army, about 20 officers who had studied in the Soviet Union were purged and a further 300 dismissed from active service. During the famine, the party secretary for agriculture, So Kwan-hui, was publicly executed in Pyongyang after being branded a "spy of the U.S. imperialists" as a scapegoat for the food crisis, and some 2,000 people were purged on espionage charges.

== The incident ==
According to a report in The Chosun Daily, Kim Jong‑il detected what were described as ‘suspicious movements’ within the VI Corps. The Daily NK reported separately that the coup plan was uncovered by the Military Security Command.

The plot, which involved the corps' political committees and battalion commanders, together with the chief secretary of North Hamgyong Province, administrative cadres, and officials of the provincial Ministry of State Security and Ministry of Social Security, was to occupy a university in Chongjin and a communications center, seize the port and missile installations, and then march on Pyongyang. They also reportedly planned to coordinate with the neighboring VII Corps.

Kim Jong-il dispatched loyalist Gen. Kim Yong-chun to suppress the corps. Troops commanded by Kim Jong-il's brother‑in‑law Jang Song-thaek were also deployed to the area. The ringleaders were arrested before any uprising could begin. The corps was disbanded and its divisions reassigned. Accounts of the number of people killed or punished vary: Daily NK reported that around 40 persons were executed and a further 300 were severely punished, while other sources stated that hundreds of soldiers were executed. Some other descriptions add that the officers were tied up and the headquarters burned down.

The exact date of the purge is given inconsistently. The Daily NK calls it the "No. 6 Corps Incident of 1996", while other South Korean and Western reports place the events in the early months of 1995.

== Aftermath ==
Kim Yong-chun's role in crushing the corps earned him quick promotion. He was appointed chief of the general staff in October 1995 and later given the title "hero". The purge showed the reach of the regime's already existing internal monitoring system, in which political committees, military commanders, and state security agents cross‑checked each other at every level, with a reporting officer connected directly to Kim Jong‑il's secretariat and the Military Security Command monitoring the entire system through wiretaps.

== Interpretation and debate ==
Journalist Barbara Demick, author of Nothing to Envy: Ordinary Lives in North Korea, has questioned the coup interpretation. Based on interviews with defectors from Chongjin, she suggested that Kim Jong-il may have acted because the corps was taking too large a share of profits from lucrative cross-border trade—which reportedly included goods such as pine mushrooms and amphetamines.
