= 27th Division (North Korea) =

The 27th Infantry Division was a military formation of the Korean People's Army, as part of the II Corps.

It defended the Kumchon area north of Kaesong with the 19th Division.

The United States 1st Cavalry Division began attacking on October 9, 1950, along the main highway from Kaesong to Kumchon. The U.S. 8th Cavalry had to stop repeatedly and wait for engineer troops to clear mines from the road. Halfway to Kumchon on the twelfth the 8th Cavalry was halted by a North Korea strongpoint, defended by tanks, self-propelled guns, and antiaircraft weapons. In spite of a sixteen-plane air strike and a 155-mm. howitzer barrage, the strongpoint held.

The U.S. 5th Cavalry's 1st Battalion encountered the 19th and 27th Division's defenses on October 11 as they were holding a long ridge with several knobs -— Hills 179, 175, and 174 -— that dominated a pass fifteen miles northeast of Kaesong. The 5th Cavalry finally drove the defenders from the ridge during the afternoon of the twelfth, after much fierce fighting.

By July 1951, it was part of the III Corps, and comprised the 172nd, 173rd, and 174th Infantry Regiments and the 27th Artillery Regiment.
