= 10th Division (North Korea) =

10th Infantry Division
- Country: North Korea
- Branch: Korean People's Army Ground Force
- Size: Division
- Engagements: Korean War: The Great Naktong Offensive; Battle of Pusan Perimeter

The 10th Infantry Division (Motorized), was a military formation of the Korean People's Army that fought during the Korean War. It was formed at Sukchon in either March or April 1950, raised from a cadre of veteran commissioned and non commissioned officers, and new recruits that were drawn from the 2nd Democratic Youth League Training Center in South P'yongan Province. The unit's original composition is unclear and the division is thought to have been made up of three motorized infantry regiments – the 25th, 27th and the 29th – and an artillery regiment, although some reports, such as those written by the Korea Institute of Military History, state that the 107th Regiment might have been assigned to the division rather than the 29th Infantry, and that there might also have been an armoured regiment attached.

The division conducted basic training at Sukchon until June 25, 1950, when it was moved to Chaeryong. There, the division's infantry undertook a further month of training focusing on night fighting and mountain warfare, under the supervision of Soviet advisors. Meanwhile, the division's artillery trained at P'yongyang. In July, the division's preparations were setback when two of the artillery regiment's battalions were transferred to the 8th Division; the deficiency that this loss caused was not rectified until the division began moving south to join the fighting.

After completing its training, the division took part in the North Korean advance from Seoul to Taejon, reaching Tilksong on 10 August. After this it took part in The Great Naktong Offensive during the Battle of Pusan Perimeter, suffering heavy casualties before withdrawing in late September, leaving behind all its artillery. These losses hampered the division's actions when it returned to the fighting in the New Year and the only indirect fire support weapons it possessed at this time were mortars. In June 1951, after undertaking guerrilla operations during which a large portion of the division was isolated behind UN lines, the division reorganized around Kunch'on and was transferred from II Corps to IV Corps.
