= X Corps (North Korea) =

- Country: North Korea
- Branch: Army
- Type: infantry
- Part of: Korean People's Army
- Garrison/HQ: Hyesan, Ryanggang

The X Corps (Korean: 제10군단) is a corps of the Korean People's Army, and was founded in Chun-dong, Hyesan, Ryanggang Province in September 2010, under the order of Kim Jong-un. The unit was observed to consist of the 42nd Brigade of Samsu County (the 1155th Army Corps), the 43rd Sniper Brigade of the Kapsan County (68th Army Corps), and the prison brigade of Poongsan-gun and Unhung County, and the troops were recruited from soldiers It consisted of military officers drawn from the IX Corps.
