= XII Corps (North Korea) =

- Active: 2010 – Present
- Country: North Korea
- Branch: Korean People's Army Ground Force
- Type: Infantry
- Size: Corps
- Part of: Korean People's Army
- Garrison/HQ: Ryanggang province
- Nicknames: "Beggar corps" "Makhno corps"

The North Korean XII Corps (Korean: 제 12군단) is a formation of the Korean People's Army Ground Force established in 2010.

== History ==
The XII Corps is a reserve infantry corps, deployed near the Korean-Chinese border, including the Ryanggang Province. Its tasks include managing the local territorial forces, homeland defence and internal security.

In January 2019, sources in Ryanggang province reported that the soldiers of XII Corps are notorious for being malnourished and undisciplined and because of this the corp is privately called by the locals as "beggar corps" or "Makhno corps". They have been known to resort to begging and theft to sustain themselves, particularly during the winter. Desertion rates within the corps are also reportedly particularly high.

== See also ==
- I Corps
- II Corps
- III Corps
- IV Corps
- V Corps
