= Kim Jong Un National Defense University =

Kim Jong-un National Defense University
- 김정은 국방종합대학

Location
- Pyongyang; North Korea
- Coordinates: 39.16921844°N 125.77796341°E

Information
- Type: Military academy
- Established: October 1964

The Kim Jong Un National Defense University (Korean: 김정은 국방종합대학; Hanja: 金正恩 國防綜合大學) is a university located in Ryongsong-guyok, Pyongyang, North Korea. The university focuses on the scientific and technical training of North Korea's national defense personnel.

== History ==
The university was founded by Kim Il Sung in October 1964 as the National Defense College (Korean: 국방대학). It was initially located in Kanggye, Chagang Province. The college was soon renamed as the National Defense University (Korean: 국방종합대학). The university was transferred to Pyongyang in 2000. In June 2016, Kim Jong Un visited the National Defense University where he said that he would turn it into the most prestigious university for training national defense science personnel. The name of the university was changed to include Kim Jong Un's name following his visit. In 2019 it was reported about expansion and construction activities in the university.

In 2020, the university participated in the Party Foundation Day military parade for the first time. The school dean was put in charge of the school's preparation for the parade and a former soldier with "relevant experience" served as flag bearer for the KJU University colour.

== National defense role ==
According to Kim Jong Un, the National Defense University deals with scientific and technical problems on the modernization of North Korea's armed forces and the development of high-tech weapons. Kim also mentioned that the university has a role in consolidating the country's status as a nuclear weapon state.

The June 13 Information Technology Company is affiliated with the university.
