= Kim Jong Suk Naval Academy =

Military school in Hamhung, North Korea

Kim Jong Suk Naval University
- 김정숙해군대학
- Interactive map of the Kim Jong Suk Naval University area

General information
- Location: Hamhung, South Hamgyong, North Korea, Hamhung, North Korea
- Coordinates: 39°52′07″N 127°41′12″E

Kim Jong Suk Naval University (Korean: 김정숙해군대학) is a post-secondary educational institution located in Hamhung, North Korea for officers of the Korean People's Navy. Its namesake is Kim Jong-suk, a Korean anti-Japanese guerrilla and North Korean leader Kim Il Sung's first wife. There is a bust in her honor at the academy. It has produced naval commanders, including dozens of Heroes of the DPRK and Heroes of Labor. It is similar in function to the Korean Naval Academy.

== History ==
It began as a naval commander school in 1947. In 1993, it was renamed after Kim Jong-suk. Kim Jong Il, visited in 2009. In 2014, Chairman Kim Jong Un oversaw the shooting competition of the faculty members of Kim Jong-suk Naval University.
