= Riwon Airport =

Airport in North Korea

- IATA: none; ICAO: none

Summary
- Airport type: Military
- Serves: Riwŏn, North Korea
- Elevation AMSL: 85 ft / 26 m
- Coordinates: 40°21′35.90″N 128°43′08.50″E

Map

Runways
Direction	Length		Surface
Direction	ft	m	Surface
11/29	8,150	2,484	Asphalt

- Riwon Airport
- Hangul: 리원비행장
- Hanja: 利原飛行場
- RR: Riwon bihaengjang
- MR: Riwŏn pihaengjang

Riwon Airport is an airport in Riwŏn-gun, Hamgyong-namdo, North Korea.

== Facilities ==
The airfield has a single asphalt runway 11/29 measuring 8150 x 128 feet (2484 x 39 m). It has a full-length parallel taxiway with aprons at each end, as well as taxiways leading nearly 1.5 km north to dispersed or underground aircraft storage. It is home to a fighter regiment of 38 MiG-21 jets.

The majority of aircraft located here tend to be a mass of J-5
