= Kang Kon Military Academy =

Military school in Pyongyang, North Korea

Kang Kon Military Academy (Korean: 강건명칭종합군관학교 Kang Kŏn Chonghapgungwanhakkyo) is a military educational institution located in the city of Pyongyang, in the Democratic People's Republic of Korea. The location is near Pyongyang International Airport. It was named after Kang Kon.
