= Song of the Korean People's Army =

North Korean song

조선인민군가 朝鮮人民軍歌
English: Military Anthem of the Korean People's Army
- Emblem of the Korean People's Army
- Military anthem of the Korean People's Army
- Lyrics: Ri Bom Su
- Music: Ra Guk
- Adopted: 1968

- Song of the Korean People's Army
- Chosŏn'gŭl: 조선인민군가
- Hancha: 朝鮮人民軍歌
- Revised Romanization: Joseon inmingunga
- McCune–Reischauer: Chosŏn inmin'gun'ga

The Song of the Korean People's Army is a patriotic song of the Korean People's Army, the army of North Korea's ruling Workers' Party of Korea composed by Ri Bom Su and Ra Guk. It was adopted in 1968 as the official anthem of the KPA.

== Lyrics ==
	Choson'gul	Hancha	Revised Romanization	English
First Verse	항일의 빛나는 전통을 이어 강철로 다져진 영광의 대오 김일성 (Note: According to the North Korean orthography rules, the name of Kim Il Sung is always set off from surrounding text by bolding)원수님의 붉은 전사로 사회주의 내 조국 지켜 싸운다	抗日의 빛나는 傳統을 이어 鋼鐵로 다져진 榮光의 隊伍 金日成元帥님의 붉은 戰士로 社會主義 내 祖國 지켜 싸운다	Hang-il-ui bichnaneun jeontong-eul ieo Gangcheollo dajyeojin yeong-gwang-ui daeo Gim il-seong wonsunim-ui bulg-eun jeonsalo Sahoejuui nae jogug jikyeo ssaunda	Continuing the proud tradition of anti-Japanese resistance, The glorious army hardened like steel, The Red Soldiers of Marshal Kim Il Sung – Fight with their lives to protect the Socialist Motherland!
Chorus	나가자 조선인민군 일당백 용맹을 떨치며 제국주의침략자 모조리 때려 부시자	나가자 朝鮮人民軍 一當百 勇猛을 떨치며 帝國主義侵略者 모조리 때려 부시자	Nagaja Joseon Inmingun; Ildangbaeg yongmaeng-eul tteolchimyeo Jegukjuuichimlyakja; Mojori ttaeryeo busija	Onward, the Korean People’s Army! Let us show our bravery is a match for a hundred men! Any Imperialist invaders, Will be completely annihilated!
Second Verse	청춘도 생명도 모두다 바쳐 혁명에 충직한 승리의 대오 위대한 수령님이 령도하시는 당중앙을 목숨으로 지켜 싸운다	靑春도 生命도 모두다 바쳐 革命에 忠直한 勝利의 隊伍 偉大한 首領님이 領導하시는 黨中央을 목숨으로 지켜 싸운다	Cheongchundo saengmyeongdo moduda bachyeo Hyeogmyeong-e chungjighan seungliui daeo Widaehan sulyeongnim-i lyeongdohasineun Dangjung-ang-eul mogsum-eulo jikyeo ssaunda	Sacrifice our youth and our life, with loyalty to the victorious army of the Revolution, Under the guidance of the Great Leader, We defend the Party Central Committee with our lives.
Third Verse	지나온 싸움의 발걸음마다 승리로 빛나는 불패의 대오 수령님이 부르시는 오직 한길로 조선의 혁명을 완수하리라	지나온 싸움의 발걸음마다 勝利로 빛나는 不敗의 隊伍 首領님이 부르시는 오직 한길로 朝鮮의 革命을 完遂하리라	Jinaon ssaum-ui balgeol-eummada Seungniro binnaneun bulpaeui daeo Sulyeongnim-i buleusineun ojig hangillo Joseon-ui hyeogmyeong-eul wansuhalila	Reminiscing every step of battles in the past, The undefeated army shining in the light of victories, Following the only path laid by the Leader; Will complete the Revolution in Korea!

== See also ==
- Music of North Korea
