= Kim Il Sung University of Politics =

- 김일성정치대학
- Pyongyang; North Korea

Information
- Type: Military academy
- Established: 17 November 1945; 80 years ago

The Kim Il Sung University of Politics (Korean: 김일성정치대학), also known as the Kim Il Sung Political University, is a university for the training of political officers in the Korean People's Army located in Hyongjesan-guyok, Pyongyang, North Korea.

== History ==
The university traces its roots to the political officers class of the Pyongyang Institute (Korean: 평양학원) that was established on 17 November 1945 and was initially located in Nampo. The political officers class was split from the institute in May 1947 to form the Second Military Officers School (Korean: 제2군관학교) and was relocated to Pyongyang.

The school was renamed in February 1952 as the Kim Chaek Political Officers School (Korean: 김책군관학교) and finally received its current name in February 1972.

== Curriculum ==
The school offers a four-year political officer training course for enlisted soldiers who have served for at least three years and for non-commissioned officers. Graduates of this course become political officers with the rank of sowi (junior lieutenant) with the best graduates attaining the rank of chungwi (lieutenant).

There are also supplementary courses for political officers. Political officers with a rank higher than a company instructor can take a three-year duty supplementary course, while officers set for promotion can take a six-month short-term supplementary course.

Among the subjects that are included in the university's curriculum are revolutionary history, Juche, Juche military theory, policies of the Workers' Party of Korea, Juche military tactics, war history, and military science.
