= I Corps (North Korea) =

- Active: 1950–present
- Country: North Korea
- Branch: Army
- Type: Infantry
- Part of: Korean People's Army
- Garrison/HQ: Kumgang County, Kangwon Province
- Engagements: Korean War

Commanders
- Lieutenant general: An Yong Hwan

I Corps (Korean: 제 1군단) is a corps of the Korean People's Army Ground Force. It is headquartered at Kumgang County but was formerly headquartered in Hoeyang County.

== History ==
The Corps was activated in 1950 with a strength of 5,000 men. It took command of the North Korean divisions on the eastern sector, in the Seoul area, with the NK II Corps on its flank. It reportedly controlled the 1st, 3rd, 4th, 6th, 13th Divisions in the initial attack.

It advanced during the early phase of the Korean War, then fought in the Battle of Pusan Perimeter.

Its headquarters is now reported as Kumgang County, Kangwon Province.

In April 2026, during the Hwasong-11D missile test, lieutenant general An Yong Hwan was mentioned as the commander of the I Corps.

=== Corps Organization ===
According to United States Far East Command Headquarters intelligence section as of 31 July 1952 a Korean People's Army Corps was commanded by a lieutenant general. The commanding general had an aide and four officers reporting directly to him. The Chief of Staff headed the corps staff section, while the corps political commander, artillery commander and rear services commander directed the operations of their respective sections. Additionally, the corps headquarters had direct command of various combat, combat support and combat service supports battalions and regiments.

The corps chief of staff directed the staff section of the corps headquarters. The section was made up of:

- Operations
- Reconnaissance
- Signal
- Officer Personnel
- Enlisted Personnel
- History
- Cryptographic
- Administration
- Finance
- Documents
- Engineers

The corps artillery section, led the corps artillery commander was also divided up into different parts:

- Operations
- Reconnaissance
- Communications
- Personnel
- Survey
- Artillery Supply
- Records

The corps political commander, responsible for political education and loyalty had five different parts.

- Political Training
- Socialist Patriotic Youth League
- Propaganda
- Cultural
- Civil Affairs

The rear services commander had largest section as well as the staff officer with operational units compromising part of it.

- Staff Sections
  - Organization & Planning
  - Administration
  - Provisions
  - Clothing
  - Ordnance
  - Food Service
  - Transportation
  - Intendance & Finance
  - Vehicle Maintenance
  - Road Maintenance
  - Medical
  - Fuel
- Service Units
  - Transportation Battalion
  - Field Hospital
  - Evacuation Medical Battalion

These independent assets were:

- Artillery Regiment
- Anti-Tank Battalion
- Replacement and Training Regiment
- Engineer Battalion
- Reconnaissance Battalion
- Signals Battalion

As of 31 July 1952, the U.S Far East Command reported the composition of I Corps units as follows:

- 8th Division
  - 81st Regiment
  - 82nd Regiment
  - 83rd Regiment
  - Artillery Regiment
- 9th Division
  - 85th Regiment
  - 86th Regiment
  - 87th Regiment
  - Artillery Regiment
- 47th Division
  - 2nd Regiment
  - 3rd Regiment
  - 4th Regiment
  - Artillery Regiment

== See also ==
- II Corps
- III Corps
- IV Corps
- V Corps
- XII Corps
- No Kwang-chol:briefly was head or the corp.

== Bibliography ==
- Appleman, Roy E. (1998), South to the Naktong, North to the Yalu: United States Army in the Korean War, Department of the Army, ISBN 978-0-16-001918-0
- History of the North Korean Army (PDF). Headquarters, Far East Command Intelligence Section. 31 July 1952.
