= III Corps (North Korea) =

- Country: North Korea
- Branch: Army
- Type: infantry
- Part of: Korean People's Army
- Garrison/HQ: Nampo, South Pyongan

The III Corps (Korean: 제 3군단) is a corps of the Korean People's Army. It was created just before the North Korean invasion of 1950 with Lt. General Yu Kyong-su in command. During the initial North Korean invasion of the south, it was in reserve, comprising the 10th Infantry Division (organised April 1950), the 13th Division (organised March 1950), and the 15th Infantry Division (organised March 1950).

== History ==
For the First and Second Battles of Wonju, it was planned that the corps would act as casualty replacement pool for the KPA II and V Corps. But like the South Koreans they were facing, the North Korean forces were also badly depleted and understrength. Although the North Koreans fielded more than 10 infantry divisions for the battle, most of the divisions' strength were equivalent to an infantry regiment.

By the time of the Korean Armistice of July 1953, the corps was one of only two KPA corps on the line, holding the extreme eastern sector, with VIII Corps and the Chinese 60th Army on the western flank. By that time it consisted of the 1st, 15th, 37th, and 45th Divisions.

== Structure ==
In July 1951, the corps consisted of:

- 1st Division, with 20th, 22nd, 24th Infantry and 1st Artillery Regiments
- 13th Division with the 19th, 21st, 23rd Infantry Regiment and 13th Artillery Regiment
- 27th Division with the 172nd, 173rd, and 174th Infantry Regiments and the 27th Artillery Regiment

Joseph S. Bermudez reports that the corps is part of the KPA's third echelon and is deployed on the western coast of North Korea, around the Pyongyang area (surrounding the area of responsibility of the Pyongyang Defense Command. He reports that as a rear corps it would contain two to five infantry divisions, a tank brigade, as well as artillery and other units.

== See also ==
- I Corps
- II Corps
- IV Corps
- V Corps
- XII Corps
