= IX Corps (North Korea) =

- Country: Democratic People's Republic of Korea
- Branch: Korean People's Army Ground Force
- Type: infantry
- Part of: Korean People's Army
- Garrison/HQ: Chongjin, North Hamgyong

The 9th Corps is a legion of the Korean People's Army.

== History ==
As the mock coup was discovered in April 1995, more than 40 corps officers were executed and reorganized from the 6th Corps to the 9th Corps.

In 1993, the Legion Political Commissioner began to enlist officers such as the Bowie and Politicians to coup. On the Lunar New Year in 1994, the Legion General rejected their proposal and died on January 2. When the corps commander died suddenly, in March 1994, General Kim Young-chun, the general secretary-general of the country, was dispatched to serve as corps commander. Coup mock members used the border to collect dollars through trade projects to raise funds for the coup without the sergeant's command. The coup mock was discovered in April 1995 following the investigation by the People's Security Agency for the distribution of dollars, and the leaders were arrested as Kim Young-chun attracted a coup meeting at the Iwon Airport in Hamgyeongnam-do. Some 40 officers of the Legion were executed, some of whom were killed in the hands of Captain Jang Seong-taek, chief of the Central Party. Thereafter, the 24th Division under the 6th Corps exchanged the 34th Division under the 5th Corps, and was renamed the 9th Corps to erase the 6th Corps, which became the pronoun of rebellion.

On May 23, 1996, Lieutenant Li Cheol-soo of the former Korean People's Army Air Force, who returned to the Republic of Korea on the Mig-19, asked at the question, "Is there any possibility of an organized rebellion within the North Korean military?" In April of 95, I heard that the South Korean sixth corps political instructor communicated with the South to dismantle and reorganize the sixth corps itself.

The 1999 administration's confidential document released by the Washington Times reporter Bill Gutz also mentioned a coup attempt.
