= VII Corps (North Korea) =

Military unit

- Country: North Korea
- Branch: Army
- Type: Infantry
- Role: Rear defense
- Part of: Korean People's Army Ground Force
- Garrison/HQ: Hamhung, South Hamgyong

Commanders
- Current commander: Chon Gil Choi

The VII (7th) Corps is a military corps of the Korean People's Army headquartered in Hamhung. On 2015 a soldier from the corps defected to South Korea.
