= IV Corps (North Korea) =

- Active: 1950–present
- Country: North Korea
- Branch: Army
- Type: infantry
- Part of: Korean People's Army
- Garrison/HQ: Haeju, South Hwanghae Province
- Engagements: Korean War

Commanders
- Lieutenant general: Jong Myong Nam

The IV Corps (Korean: 제 4군단) is a corps of the Korean People's Army of the Democratic People's Republic of Korea. It was established after the outbreak of the Korean War in June 1950.

== History ==
Rottman writes that in July 1951 it comprised the 4th and 5th Divisions, the 105th Armoured Division, and the 26th Brigade. By the ceasefire of July 1953, it comprised the 4th, 5th, and 10th Divisions.

In 2001, it was responsible for the southwestern part of North Korea. The corps is reportedly headquartered at Haeju, South Hwanghae Province.

In April 2026, during the Hwasong-11D missile test, lieutenant general Jong Myong Nam was mentioned as the commander of the IV Corps.

== See also ==
- I Corps
- II Corps
- III Corps
- V Corps
- XII Corps
