= V Corps (North Korea) =

- Active: 1950–present
- Country: North Korea
- Branch: Army
- Type: infantry
- Part of: Korean People's Army
- Garrison/HQ: Sepo County, Kangwon Province
- Engagements: Korean War

Commanders
- Lieutenant general: Ri Jong Guk

The V Corps (Korean: 제 5군단) of the Korean People's Army was created before January 1951.

== History ==
Consisted of at least 3 divisions on January 7, 1951, when 2 divisions assaulted the U.S. 2nd Infantry Division in a frontal attack, while a third division attacked from the northwest against the adjacent ROK 8th Division. They were assisted by one of the divisions of the NKPA II Corps, which also launched attacks against the neighboring ROK III Corps to the east. The North Koreans managed to force the 2nd Division out of Wonju by the evening of January 7, and all counterattacks failed to retake the city.

In April 2026, during the Hwasong-11D missile test, lieutenant general Ri Jong Guk was mentioned as the commander of the V Corps.

== See also ==
- I Corps
- II Corps
- III Corps
- IV Corps
- XII Corps
