= 2nd Division (North Korea) =

Guards Kang Kon 2nd Infantry Division
- Guards badge
- Active: 1946 – ?
- Country: North Korea
- Branch: Korean People's Army
- Type: Infantry warfare
- Engagements: Korean War

Commanders
- Notable commanders: Major General Kang Kon

The 2nd Infantry Division was a military formation of the Korean People's Army (North Korea) that fought during the Korean War. It is uncertain when the unit was originally raised, however, it is believed to have been formed sometime between 1946 and 1947. It was officially activated at Naman in February 1948 under Major General Kang Kon with a total strength of 14,000 soldiers.

== History ==
=== Early involvement in the Korean War ===
The division's artillery and other elements assembled near the 38th parallel on 12 June 1950 and went into battle for the first time during the fighting around Chunchon on 26–27 June, where the artillery units were badly mauled by accurate counter-battery fire from artillery units of the Republic of Korea. During August and September, the division fought in the Battle of Pusan Perimeter before heavy losses forced it to be re-organised in November at Kanggye. Losses were particularly bad for the division's artillery units, so much so that by December when the division participated in the II Corps flanking action in the Hwach'on Sector it did so without any artillery pieces.

During the battles of attrition that followed further losses were suffered and as the UN forces slowly pushed the North Koreans back up the peninsula and by the time the division reached the II Corps assembly area near Hoeyang a comprehensive re-organisation was undertaken. Between March and May 1951 the division was brought up to strength through a large number of new recruits, as well as a receiving a large amount of new Soviet-type equipment.

In May 1951 the division took part in a renewed North Korean offensive that took it to Hajinbu-ri. As UN forces began to respond with heavy artillery attacks, the division was forced to withdraw in early June to the Inje Area. For the next few months the division undertook defensive operations in the area, and as the tactical situation was stabilised, the North Koreans were able to bring the division back up to authorised strength. Supplies were said to be plentiful in this time, although quality of ammunition remained problematic.

At this time the 2nd Artillery Regiment was detached from the division to conduct a three-month period of training at Hoeyang, whilst the division's rifle or infantry regiments received a certain amount of artillery pieces, including a number of regimental howitzers of the 76 mm calibre.

== Formation ==
The 2nd Division was made up of the following units:

- 4th Infantry Regiment
- 5th Infantry Regiment (later transferred to the 4th Infantry Division)
- 6th Infantry Regiment
- 2nd Artillery Regiment
- 17th Infantry Regiment (replaced 5th Rifle Regiment)

== See also ==
- 1st Division (North Korea)
- 3rd Division (North Korea)
- 4th Division (North Korea)
