= II Corps (North Korea) =

- Active: 1950–present
- Country: North Korea
- Branch: Army
- Type: infantry
- Part of: Korean People's Army
- Garrison/HQ: Pyongsan County, North Hwanghae Province
- Engagements: Korean War

Commanders
- Lieutenant general: Ju Song Nam

The II Corps (Korean: 제 2군단) is a corps of the Korean People's Army. It was created on June 12, 1950 with Lt. General Kim Kwang-hyop in command. During the Korean War the unit was composed of the 2nd Infantry Division, the 5th Infantry Division, and the 12th Infantry Division.

The 27th Infantry Division was part of the II Corps. It defended the Kumchon County area north of Kaesong with the 19th Division. The U.S. 1st Cavalry Division began attacking on October 9, 1950, along the main highway from Kaesong to Kumchon. The US 8th Cavalry had to stop repeatedly and wait for engineer troops to clear mines from the road. Halfway to Kumchon on the twelfth the 8th Cavalry was halted by a North Korea strongpoint, defended by tanks, self-propelled guns, and antiaircraft weapons. In spite of a sixteen-plane air strike and a 155-mm. howitzer barrage, the strongpoint held.

1st Battalion, 5th Cavalry encountered the 19th and 27th Division's defenses on October 11 as they were holding a long ridge with several knobs— Hills 179, 175, and 174—that dominated a pass fifteen miles northeast of Kaesong. The 5th Cavalry finally drove the defenders from the ridge during the afternoon of the twelfth, after much fierce fighting.

Probably consisted of at least 3 divisions on January 7, 1951, when one division attacked the adjacent ROK 8th Infantry Division. They were assisted by one of the divisions of the NKPA V Corps. The II Corps also attacked the ROK III Corps to the east with its remaining divisions. The II Corps managed to penetrate the ROK III Corps defenses and cause concerns about the stability of the UN lines.

Globalsecurity.org has reported that the corps is part of the First Echelon of the KPA and now consists of the 3rd, 6th, and 8th Infantry Divisions.

In April 2026, during the Hwasong-11D missile test, lieutenant general Ju Song Nam was mentioned as the commander of the II Corps.

== See also ==
- I Corps
- III Corps
- IV Corps
- V Corps
- XII Corps
