= Battle of Jangsari =

Korean War battle

- Part of Korean War
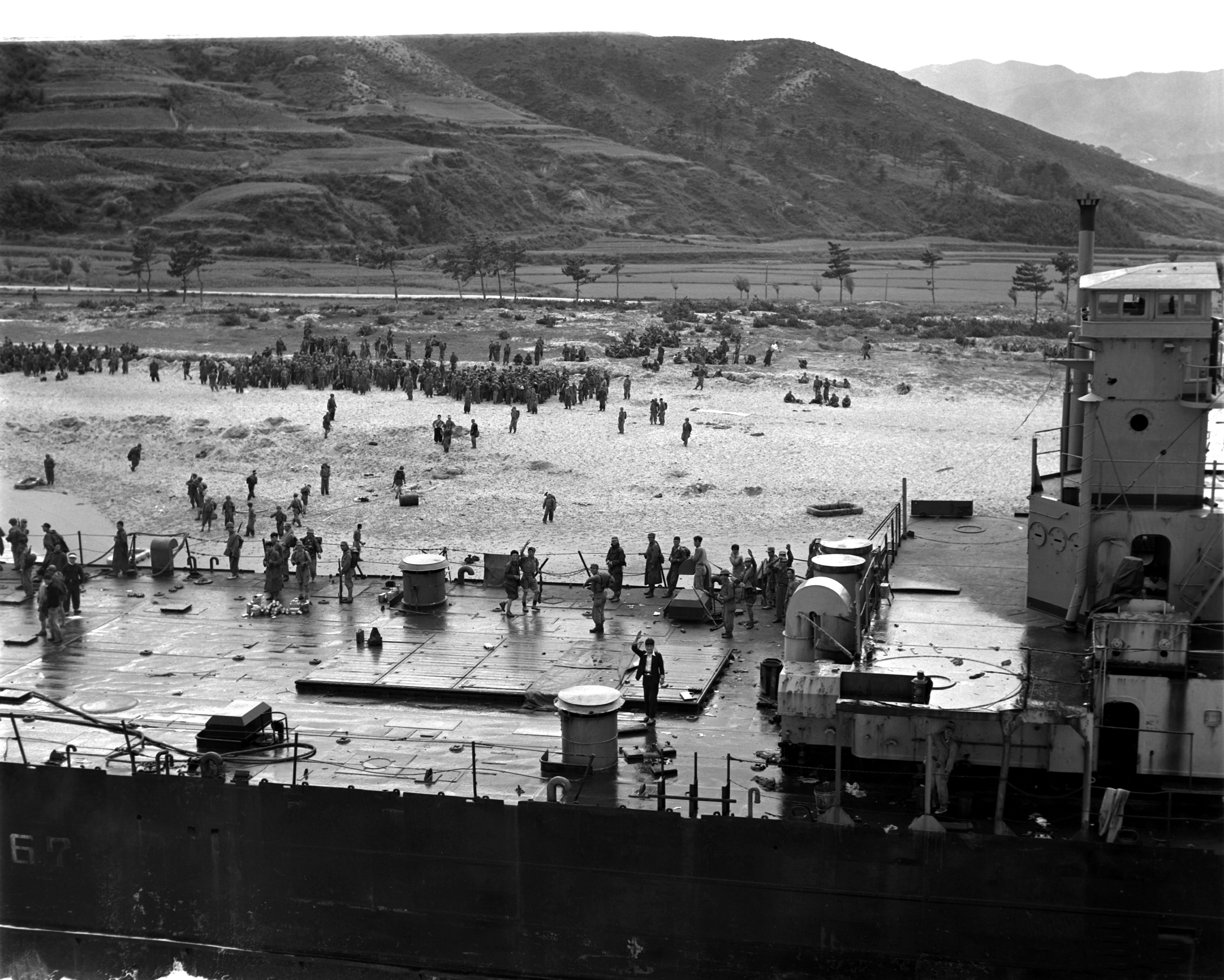
- LST Munsan and troops at Jangsari
Date	15–18 September 1950
Location	Jangsari, Yeongdeok County, North Gyeongsang Province, South Korea 36.282°N 129.376°E
Result	Inconclusive

Belligerents
South Korea	North Korea

Commanders and leaders
Lee Myung-heum	Unknown

Units involved
Independent 1st Guerrilla Battalion (ko:독립 제1유격대대)	5th Division

Strength
772 (estimate)	Unknown

Casualties and losses
39 killed (estimate), 32 captured	~120–130 killed in action (estimate)

The Battle of Jangsari (Korean: 장사리전투; Hanja: 長沙里戰鬪; RR: Jangsari Jeaontu) or Operation Jangsa Landing (장사상륙작전; 長沙上陸作戰; Jangsa Sangnyuk Jakjeon) was an amphibious invasion and battle of the Korean War. The official report name for the operation was 'Operational Order 174' (작전명령 174호).

== Background ==
In September 1950, UN Forces planned to launch an all-out offensive along the entire Pusan Perimeter, in coordination with the Inchon landing.

The main objective of the Jangsari operation was to block the supply route and therefore achieve disruption of the North Korean Korean People's Army (KPA) forces around Pusan Perimeter by hit-and-run tactics and to draw KPA forces away from the Inchon landing.

== Battle ==
=== Landing ===
The landing force consisted of 'Independent 1st Guerrilla Battalion' comprising approximately 772 student volunteer soldiers specially trained and armed with Russian-type weapons, led by Republic of Korea Army Captain Lee Myung-heum.

On 15 September, at about 02:00 in the morning in the middle of Typhoon Kezia, the battle group landed from LST Munsan. The entire beach and the adjacent Hill 200 was captured by 14:50 at the cost of about 150 casualties (60 Killed in action, 90 Wounded in action) The LST Munsan, was stranded in the landing. The landing took place in the rear of the KPA 5th Division. Its mission was to harass the enemy rear while the ROK 3rd Division attacked north from Pohang.

Also on 15 September, UN Forces began the Inchon Landing. On 16 September, UN Forces began their Pusan Perimeter offensive.

=== Defence ===
On the evening of 15 September, the KPA 12th Regiment sent a battalion to engage the Independent 1st Guerrilla Battalion. The U.S. Navy 7th Fleet bombardment task force had to rush to its assistance and place a ring of naval gunfire around it on the beach, where KPA fire had driven the battalion, saving it from total destruction.

=== Withdrawal ===
On 18 September, approximately 725 survivors of the Independent 1st Guerrilla Battalion, were evacuated by the ROK Navy's LST Jochiwon. 39 dead were left behind and a further 32 members of the 5th Platoon, 2nd Company covered the withdrawal, were unable to be evacuated.

== Honor ==
In 1960, Douglas MacArthur sent the letter to commander Lee Myung-heum (He later changed his name to Lee Jong-hoon)

Dear Chairman Lee Jong Hoon:

I was delighted to receive your letter of recent date telling of the formation of the 772 Volunteer Comrade Club. The operation they performed in support of the Incheon Landing was a brilliant one and worthy of the highest commendation. The valor and sacrifice of its members will always be a shining example for the youth of Korea. Please extend to its members my heartiest greetings and affectionate regards. I shall always remember them as loyal and devoted comrades-in-arms.

With best wishes, Most sincerely,

Douglas MacArthur

== Memorial ==
Since 1960, comrade club had a memorial service.

On 14 July 1980, the surviving Independent 1st Guerrilla Battalion formed the Jangsa Landing Operation Guerrilla Comrades Association. (장사상륙작전참전유격동지회), 51 years since the Jangsa landing operation, the comrades association held a national fund-raising campaign together with the monk of Cheongunsa Temple in Yangpyeong, Gyeonggi-do and established memorial monument on September 14 1991.

On 6 March 1997, the forgotten battle of the Korean War was revealed to the public when the members of the 1st Marine Division Special Reconnaissance Unit, who were searching the shore in front of Jangsari, discovered LST Munsan in the tidal flat under the sea.

A 2,000 tons replica of the LST Munsan was constructed as the Jangsa Landing Operation Commemorative Park, which opened on 16 November 2020.

== In the popular culture ==
- The Battle of Jangsari
