= USS LST-120 =

LST-1-class landing ship tank

Coordinates: 36.2800486°N 129.3788641°E

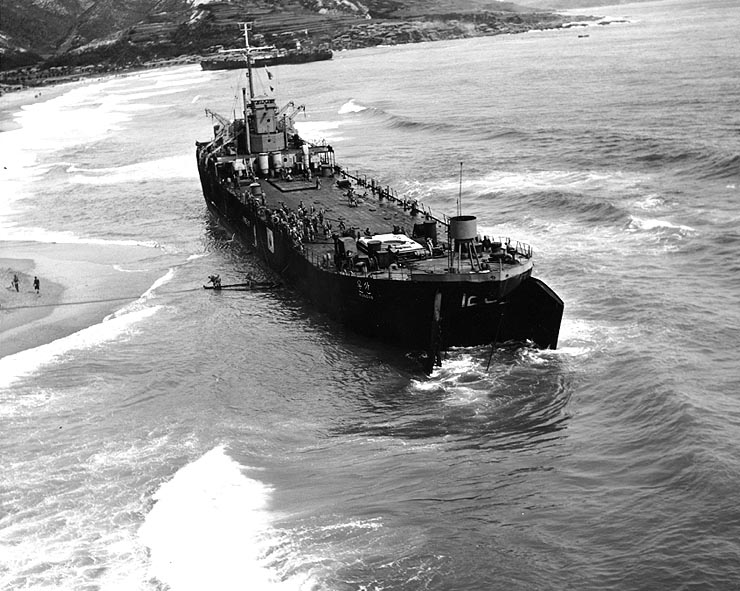
- ROKS Munsan in September 1950

History

United States
- Name: LST-120
- Builder: Jeffersonville Boat & Machine Co., Jeffersonville
- Laid down: 5 May 1943
- Launched: 7 August 1943
- Sponsored by: Mrs Laura K. Richert
- Commissioned: 22 September 1943
- Decommissioned: 7 January 1946
- Stricken: 5 March 1947
- Identification: Callsign: NPHQ
- Fate: Transferred to South Korea, 1947

History

South Korea
- Name: Munsan; (문산)
- Namesake: Munsan
- Acquired: February 1947
- Commissioned: February 1947
- Fate: Beached in Jangsa, 1950

General characteristics
- Class & type: LST-1-class tank landing ship
- Displacement: 1,625 long tons (1,651 t) light; 4,080 long tons (4,145 t) full (sea-going draft with 1675 ton load)
- Length: 327 ft 9 in (99.90 m)
- Beam: 50 ft (15 m)
- Draft: Light: 2 ft 4 in (0.71 m) forward; 7 ft 6 in (2.29 m) aft; Sea-going: 8 ft 3 in (2.51 m) forward; 14 ft 1 in (4.29 m) aft; Landing (with 500 ton load): 3 ft 11 in (1.19 m) forward; 9 ft 10 in (3.00 m) aft
- Propulsion: 2 General Motors 12-567 900 hp (671 kW) diesel engines, two shafts, twin rudders
- Speed: 12 knots (22 km/h; 14 mph)
- Range: 24,000 nmi (44,000 km) at 9 kn (17 km/h; 10 mph)
- Boats & landing craft carried: 2 × LCVPs
- Complement: 7 officers, 104 enlisted
- Armament: 2 × twin 40 mm gun mounts; 4 × single 40 mm gun mounts; 12 × single 20 mm gun mounts

USS LST-120 was a LST-1-class tank landing ship in the United States Navy during World War II. She was later transferred to the Republic of Korea Navy and renamed ROKS Munsan.

== Construction and commissioning ==
LST-120 was laid down on 5 May 1943 at Jeffersonville Boat & Machine Co., Jeffersonville, Indiana. Launched on 7 August 1943 and commissioned on 22 September 1943.

=== Service in the United States Navy ===
During World War II, LST-120 was assigned to the Asiatic-Pacific theater. She took part in the capture and occupation of Saipan from 15 June to 28 July 1944 and also took part in the capture and occupation of Tinian from 24 to 28 July 1944.

She was then assigned to the occupation service in the Far East from 15 to 25 October 1945 and 18 November 1945 to 13 February 1946.

On 7 January 1946, she was decommissioned and transferred to Commander Naval Forces Far East (COMNAVFE), Shipping Control Authority for Japan (SCAJAP), redesignated Q004.

The ship was put on disposal until she was transferred to South Korea in February 1947. The ship was later struck from the Navy Register on 5 March 1947.

=== Service in the Republic of Korea Navy ===
In February 1947, the Korean government bought the LST-120 and named it Munsan. She was moored at Mukho Port to load coal, and when the Korean War broke out, she was requisitioned under the wartime mobilization order of Lieutenant Colonel Kim Du-chan, deputy commander of the ROK Navy's Mukho Guard.

At that time, the Mukho Combat Unit, a joint army-police unit, was fighting against the 549th Army Squadron of the Korean People's Army, which landed on June 25, 1950. Munsan evacuated the retreating Mukho combat unit to Pohang, and three days later, it returned to Mukho with the reorganized Mukho combat unit under the orders of the Naval Headquarters. Around 2 am on June 29, not knowing that the Munsan was left at Mukho Port, she was bombarded by USS Juneau (CL-119), which she mistook for a ship of the Korean People's Army Navy. She just sent a Navy intelligence officer who was on board the Munsan to confirm that she was a ship belonging to the Republic of Korea Navy, clearing up her misunderstanding, and she withdrew to Pohang.

She participated in the Yeosu evacuation operation under the escort of ROKS Baekdusan (PC-701).

==== Battle of Jangsari ====
On September 15, Munsan set sail to support the Jangsa landing operation of the 'Independent 1st Guerrilla Battalion' (Estimate: Total 772 - 718 of student volunteer soldiers led by Republic of Korea Army including Captain Lee Myung-heum)

She arrived in Jangsa with 772 men in her squadron, but she was soon stranded ashore by Typhoon Kezia. The battalion, which barely landed, attracted the attention of the 2nd Corps of the Korean People's Army for a week, and in the battle with them, Captain Hwang Jae-jung and crew of the Munsan were killed. The survivors were covered by the 7th Fleet bombardment task force, which had USS Helena as their flagship, on September 19 and withdrew aboard the ROK Navy's LST Jochiwon.

== Memorial ==
On March 6, 1997, the forgotten operation of the Korean War was revealed to the public when the members of the 1st Marine Division Special Reconnaissance Unit, who were searching the shore in front of Jangsari, discovered Munsan in the tidal flat under the sea.

A 2,000 tons replica of the Munsan was constructed as the Jangsa Landing Operation Commemorative Park.

On 16 November 2020, The Memorial museum was opened.

== Awards ==
LST-120 have earned the following awards

2 battle stars

Citations

== Sources ==
- United States. Dept. of the Treasury (1962). Treasury Decisions Under the Customs, Internal Revenue, Industrial Alcohol, Narcotic and Other Laws, Volume 97. U.S. Government Printing Office.
- Moore, Capt. John (1984). Jane's Fighting Ships 1984-85. Jane's Information Group. ISBN 978-0710607959.
- Saunders, Stephen (2009). Jane's Fighting Ships 2009-2010. Jane's Information Group. ISBN 978-0710628886.
- Fairplay International Shipping Journal Volume 222. United Kingdom: Fairplay Publishing Limited. 1967.
