= USS Loeser =

Buckley-class destroyer escort

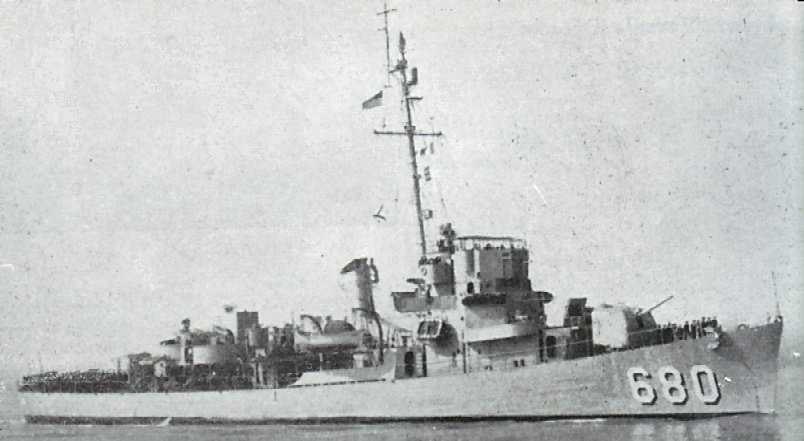

History

United States
- Name: Loeser
- Builder: Bethlehem Steel's Fore River Shipyard, Quincy, Massachusetts
- Laid down: 27 July 1943
- Launched: 11 September 1943
- Commissioned: 10 October 1943
- Decommissioned: 1 August 1962
- Stricken: 23 August 1968
- Fate: Sunk as a target, 1969

General characteristics
- Displacement: 1,740 tons full; 1,400 tons, standard
- Length: 306 ft 0 in (93 m)
- Beam: 36 ft 9 in (11.20 m)
- Draft: 13 ft 6 in (4.11 m)
- Propulsion: GE turbo-electric drive; 12,000 shp (8.9 MW); two propellers
- Speed: 24 knots (44 km/h)
- Range: 4,940 nautical miles (9,150 km) at 12 knots (22 km/h)
- Complement: 15 officers, 198 men
- Armament: 3 × 3 in (76 mm) DP guns; 3 × 21 in (53 cm) torpedo tubes; 1 × 1.1 in (28 mm) quad AA gun; 8 × 20 mm cannon; 1 × hedgehog projector; 2 × depth charge tracks; 8 × K-gun depth charge projectors

USS Loeser (DE-680) was a Buckley-class destroyer escort of the United States Navy, named in honor of Lieutenant Commander Arthur E. Loeser (1903–1942).

The ship was named after Arthur Edward Loeser, who was a naval officer killed in action aboard the light cruiser USS Atlanta during the Naval Battle of Guadalcanal on 13 November 1942.

== Construction and commissioning ==
Loeser was laid down on 27 July 1943 by Bethlehem Steel's Fore River Shipyard, Quincy, Massachusetts; launched on 11 September 1943; sponsored by Mrs. Marion Loeser, widow of Lt. Cmdr. Loeser and commissioned on 10 October 1943.

== World War II ==
Following shakedown off Bermuda the new destroyer escort departed Norfolk, Virginia, on 11 December 1943 for Pearl Harbor en route to escort duty in the South Pacific war zone. Arriving Funafuti, Ellice Islands, on 16 January 1944, Loeser departed the 18th, escorting a transport to Guadalcanal. Returning to Funafuti on 27 January, she sailed the next day for Efate, New Hebrides, and arrived 31 January. She steamed north 6 February for gunnery exercises off Espírito Santo, then departed later that month for Guadalcanal and four months of transport-escort duty in the Solomon Islands.

Loeser departed Guadalcanal for Espiritu Santo on 28 June en route to Australia, arrived Sydney on 18 July for repairs, and sailed nine days later for Purvis Bay, Florida Islands. After three weeks in drydock, Loeser departed for Guam on 21 August escorting Celeno (AK-76). LST-120 joined the convoy off Eniwetok Atoll, Marshall Islands, and they arrived Guam on 5 September. Following five days of antisubmarine patrol off Guam, Loeser escorted three submarines back to Eniwetok, then departed 21 September for a roundabout passage via Guadalcanal to Hawaii.

Reaching Pearl Harbor 8 October, the ship underwent extensive engineering alteration during October and early November. Getting underway 6 November, Loeser made Guadalcanal the 18th, and arrived Manus Island, Admiralty Islands, 25 November for duty with Amphibious Group 3. She spent December in gunnery exercises off New Guinea, before departing Hollandia on the 30th for the invasion of Lingayen Gulf.

Loeser arrived off the Lingayen beachhead 11 January 1945, two days after D-Day, and during the following week escorted inbound transports through the treacherous swept channels leading into Lingayen Gulf. From 18 January to 7 February, the versatile destroyer escort went on the offensive to hunt the ubiquitous Japanese submarines lurking off Lingayen and endangering vital American supply lines. With the liberation of northern Luzon virtually completed, Loeser sailed for Subic Bay en route to Leyte and points east, reaching Ulithi, Caroline Islands, on 19 February.

Loeser left Ulithi 5 March for the invasion of Iwo Jima. She arrived the 19th, and began nine long days of antisubmarine patrol. She then steamed eastward, touching Eniwetok on 2 April and arriving Pearl Harbor the 13th. During the final months of the Pacific war, the battle-tested destroyer escort remained in Hawaiian waters and contributed her invaluable experience to the already rigorous submarine training program.

Loeser departed Hawaii for the west coast on 26 August and arrived San Francisco on 3 September. After overhaul and a five-month tour with the San Diego Underway Training Unit, the ship joined the Atlantic Fleet at New London, Connecticut, 3 April 1946 for continued submarine training duty. She was decommissioned on 28 March 1947 and entered the Atlantic Reserve Fleet at Charleston, South Carolina

== 1951–1968 ==
When communist aggression in Korea required the Navy to strengthen its active fleet, Loeser was recommissioned at Charleston 9 March 1951. After refresher training in the Caribbean, she rejoined the Atlantic Fleet at Norfolk. During the next 7 1/2 years of active service, the destroyer escort served each spring with the Naval Operational Development Station-at Key West, underwent a major overhaul, and made two cruises to Europe. In 1952, the ship departed Norfolk on 25 August, called at Edinburgh, Scotland, and Kristiansand, Norway, then returned home 12 October. During the 1954 European cruise, Loeser operated with the battleship Wisconsin (BB-64) and visited Dublin, Ireland, and Portsmouth, England.

Designated a Naval Reserve ship for the Little Creek, Virginia, area June 1958, Loeser was decommissioned on 1 December 1958 and was placed in an in-service status under Commandant 5th Naval District. With this new concept of Reserve training, Loeser maintained a Regular Navy nucleus crew that was augmented by reservists during the monthly weekend cruises or during time of national emergency. This system provided the closest possible coordination and communication between regulars and reservists, preparing the reservists, as no shore-based activity could, to augment the Regular Navy in any situation.

The Selected Reserve Ship Program paid off handsomely when President John F. Kennedy called up the reserves during the 1961 Berlin crisis. Taking up the challenge, Loeser recommissioned 2 October 1961, embarked her Reserve crew, and arrived Guantanamo Bay 19 October for refresher training. She departed for Newport, Rhode Island on 24 November but returned to the Caribbean on 12 January 1962 for patrol duty along the eastern coast of Cuba. She remained on station until 24 March 1962; each vessel sighted was checked and identified to guard against any subversive elements in the Caribbean area.

After returning to Newport 28 March, the ship decommissioned 1 August 1962 and became the Naval Reserve ship for the Williamsburg, Virginia, area. Loeser shifted home port to the Washington Navy Yard on 20 October 1964, where she served as Naval Reserve ship for the Washington, D.C., area until struck from the Navy List on 23 August 1968.

Loeser was sunk as a target, date unknown.

Loeser received two battle stars for World War II service.
