= Student Volunteer Forces =

Volunteers during the Korean War

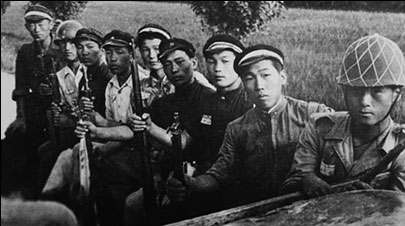
Student volunteer soldiers in Daegu in 1950.

Student Volunteer Forces (Korean: 학도의용군) or Student Volunteer Troops (학도의용대), also known as Student Volunteer Soldiers (학도의용병) or simply Student Soldiers (학도병), were students that fought against the North Korean forces and Chinese forces on behalf of South Korea during the Korean War.

Students volunteered or were conscripted into the Republic of Korea Armed Forces as emergency troops to fight against North Korea's invasion of South Korea, which almost overran the country. The student volunteer troops were demobilized when South Korean and United Nations forces secured the 38th parallel in March 1951, when most of them returned to their education and some enlisted in the ROK Army.

== Term ==
The term "student soldier" has two meanings in South Korea. Firstly, student soldiers who served in the Imperial Japanese Armed Forces during World War II in the Japanese occupation period (refer to 学徒出陣). Secondly, student soldiers who served in the South Korean Armed Forces during the Korean War.

Student soldiers who fought in the Korean War prefer to be called Student Volunteer Forces.

== History ==
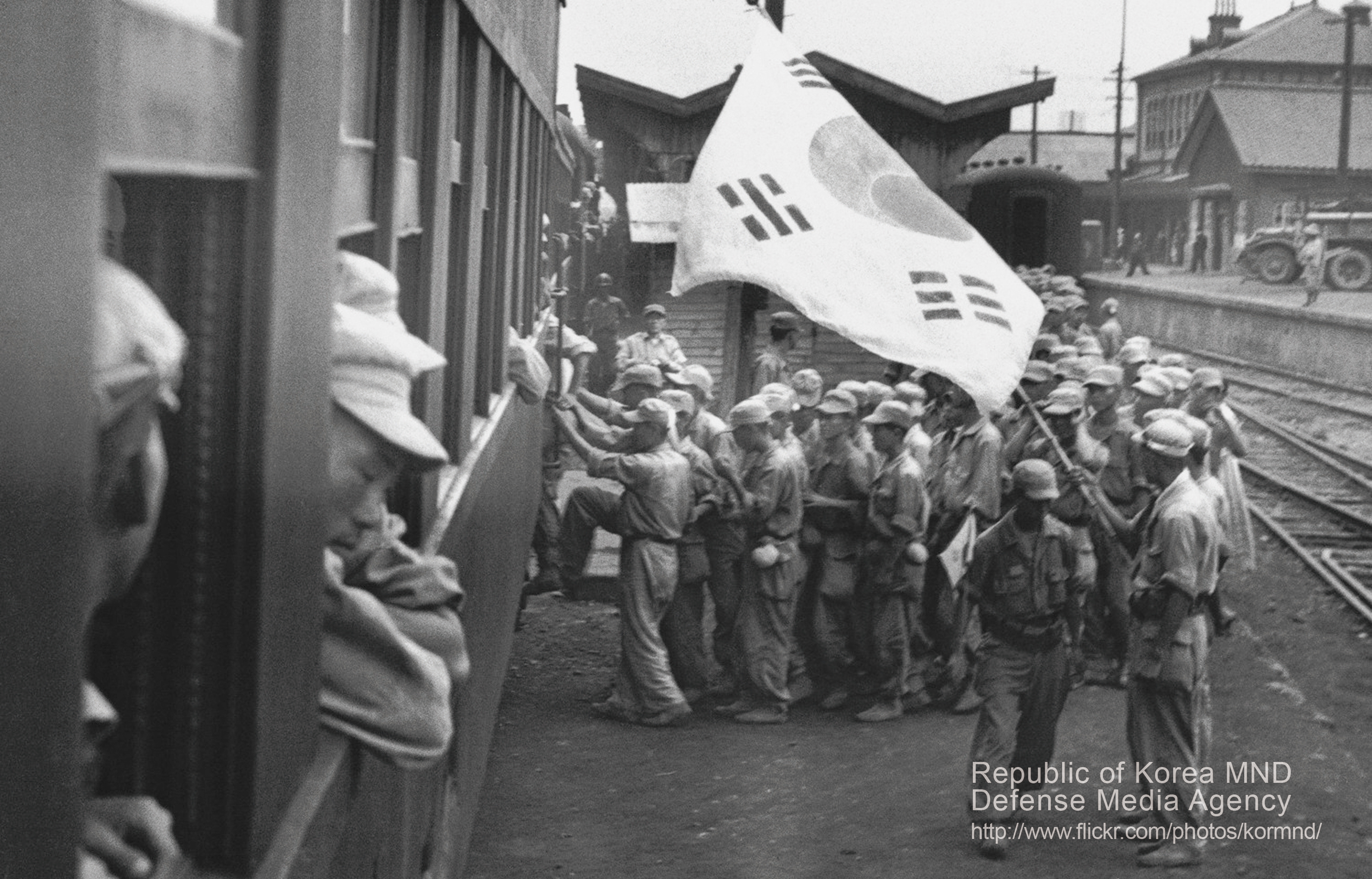
Students boarding a train to join the Republic of Korea Army.

The organization of the Emergency Student Soldiers Army (비상학도대) by 200 student officers of the Student Association for the Protection of the Country (학도호국단) from the Seoul area, and met in Suwon was the first time students were conscripted to be soldiers. Some of them bore rifles and ammunition with their uniforms as they entered the South Korean army unit, which had been guarding the Han River from June 29, 1950, in order to participate in the battle. However, the Ministry of National Defense made most of the student soldiers responsible for the rear-area missions, including refugee relief, bulletin reports and street propaganda. Many students were not satisfied with their mission in the rear, but they supported individual enlistment, and the rest asked students to authorize the Ministry of National Defense to form a battle unit with the school only. However, the Ministry of National Defense's high-ranking officials insisted on pursuing the guidance of the Ministry of Defense while retaining the participation of the academics who would bear the future of the nation. The evacuation academics who went to Daejeon on July 14 and the local academics organized themselves again.

The students individually supported the local enlistment and served as soldiers of the Armed Forces. A number of female students were also appointed as nurses. The student soldiers went down to Daegu and were once again organized into 10 divisions of the armed forces and their subordinate units. The student soldiers had great achievements in the Nakdong River Defense Line, which was considered as the last fortress. About 700 of them were transferred to UN troops in Busan in mid-July. After graduating, they went to Japan and went on a regular operation in Incheon Landing Operation on September 15. In addition, the 22nd and 26th Regiments of the 3rd Infantry Division of the ROK Army, and the 15th Regiment of the 1st Infantry Division of the ROK Army filled the majority of the recruits with the student soldiers from the middle of July. At the beginning of August, the newly formed 25th of June cohort, in Daegu also filled most of the troop vacancies with student soldiers.

In early August, about 1,500 students from the army headquarters of the Army headquarters in Daegu soon joined the South Korean Armed Forces in Milyang. They penetrated the enemy's rear area and began guerrilla warfare. Among them, the 1st Battalion was involved in a landing operation in Yeongdeok District, Gyeongsangbuk-do, and 100 of the enemy were killed. The 2nd, 3rd and 5th battalions were deployed to the Taebaek mountain range from early October and cleared the enemy who fled. After that, they were deployed into the Honam district again from December, and the remaining enemy were removed. The school graduates also accomplished a great deal by carrying out pre-emptive activities for the residents in the vulnerable area south of the 38th parallel in the restoration area, where spies were often found.

As the army crossed the 38th parallel, the academics of the restoration area also supported the operation of the armed forces through various organizations themselves. They were grouped together with a 1.4 retreat and continued in the name of the school militia, and many of them enlisted as regular army troops, numbering about 4,000.

=== Return to School ===
In March 1951, when the South Korean Armed Forces and UN Forces overcame the Chinese army and restored the balance and stability of the front lines, the people who came down to find refugees also began to return to their hometowns to regain their jobs.

President Syngman Rhee announced that the young students who were the future of the nation should return to the academy urgently to continue their studies. The Ministry of Education issued the following instructions to the students scattered across the country.

Students received good luck blessings:

1. All student soldiers will return to their original school.
2. School authorities will accept unconditional restitution if the military service of the school is cancelled due to military service
3. The military and other schools will be returning from military service
4. The students who missed the grade promotion of military uniforms will accept grade promotion according to their wishes.

The student volunteers lay down their weapons and took off their uniforms in Hongcheon, Gangwon-do on March 16, and students who insisted on fighting to the end, including many North Korean student soldiers, enlisted again in the field and received appropriate ranks and service numbers.

== Student Volunteer Force of Koreans In Japan ==
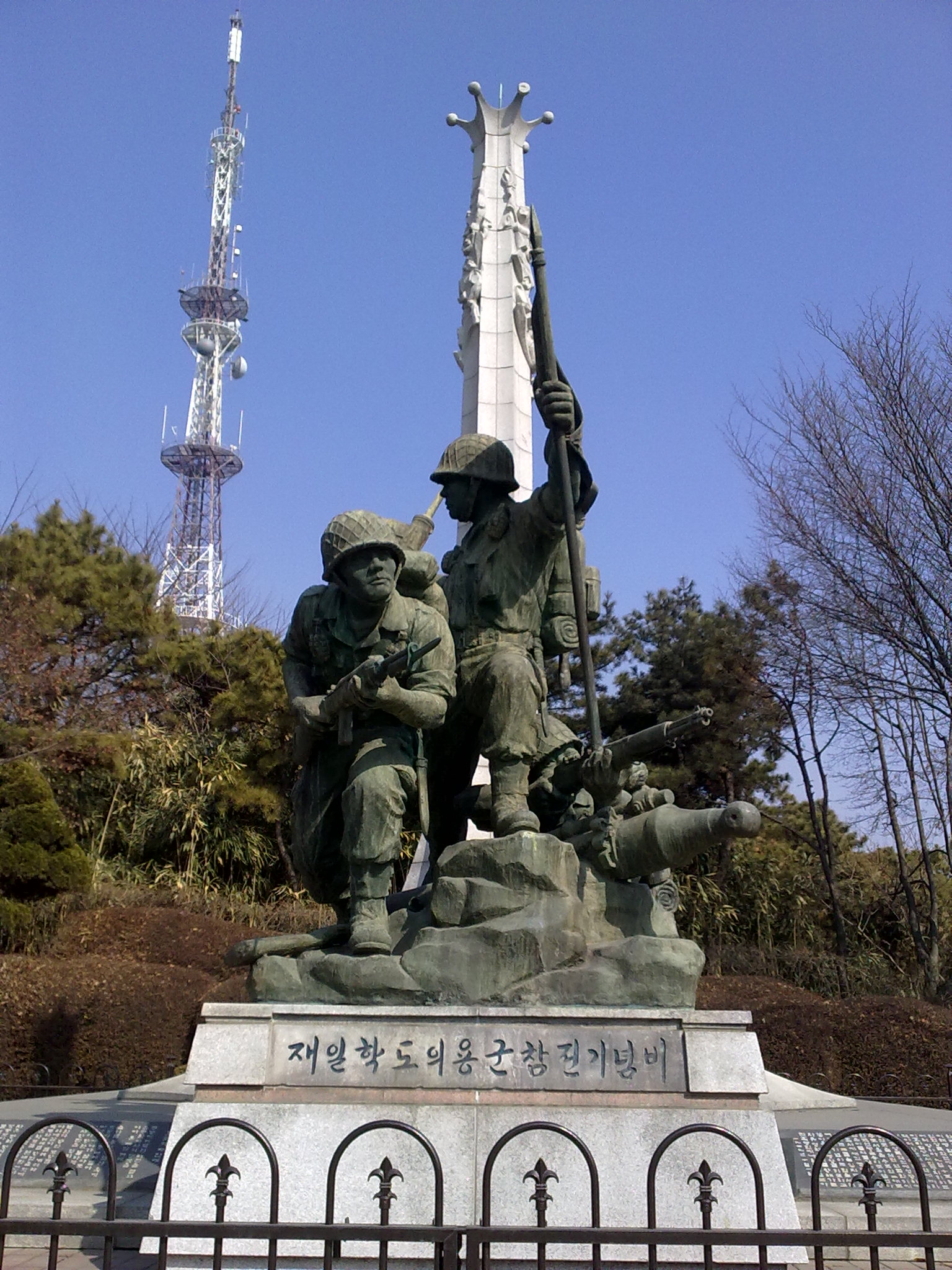
'Student Volunteer Force of Koreans In Japan' monument in Incheon.

642 Koreans who resided in Japan (most of them students) also joined the South Korean Armed Forces to rescue their homeland.

Ah! This is the motherland of today. This is the image of the motherland I was proud of. How much I missed my country and rejoiced at its liberation… However, the real homeland is bloody and in ruins.

— Lee Hwal-nam, "one of the first group of Student Volunteer Force of Koreans In Japan", From his memoirs

They were called the Student Volunteer Force of Koreans In Japan (Korean: 재일학도의용군, romanized: JaeIlHakDoUiYongGun) and attached to the US Army and ROK Army.

In the beginning, they didn't have a rank or dog tags. Their only identifying mark was an attached patch with a wordmark containing the words S.V. FROM JAPAN on their uniforms. They participated in the Battle of Inchon, Battle of Chosin Reservoir, Battle of the Punchbowl, Battle of White Horse Hill and many others and casualties are as follows,

Casualties
Cause	Number
KIA	52
MIA	83
Returned to Japan	265
Stayed in South Korea (Note: Treaty of San Francisco came into effect on 28 April 1952, which the Japanese Government refused to admit)	242

== Main battles ==
- Battle of Hadong
- Battle of P'ohang-dong
- Battle of Jangsari
- Student Volunteer Force of Koreans In Japan
  - Battle of Inchon
  - Battle of Chosin Reservoir
  - Battle of the Punchbowl
  - Battle of White Horse Hill

== Monuments and Memorials hall ==
=== Student Volunteer Forces Korean War monument ===
There is a monument in front of Pohang Girls' High School in Haksan-dong, Buk-gu, Pohang, Gyeongsangbuk-do where 71 students were ambushed wearing their uniforms at 4AM on 11 August 1950. They fought for an extended period of time with the North Korean Army, backed up by five armoured vehicles. In all 48 died. In order to honour their noble sacrifice, Pohang City built the memorial in 1977 and held a memorial service.

=== Student Volunteer Force Memorial Hall ===
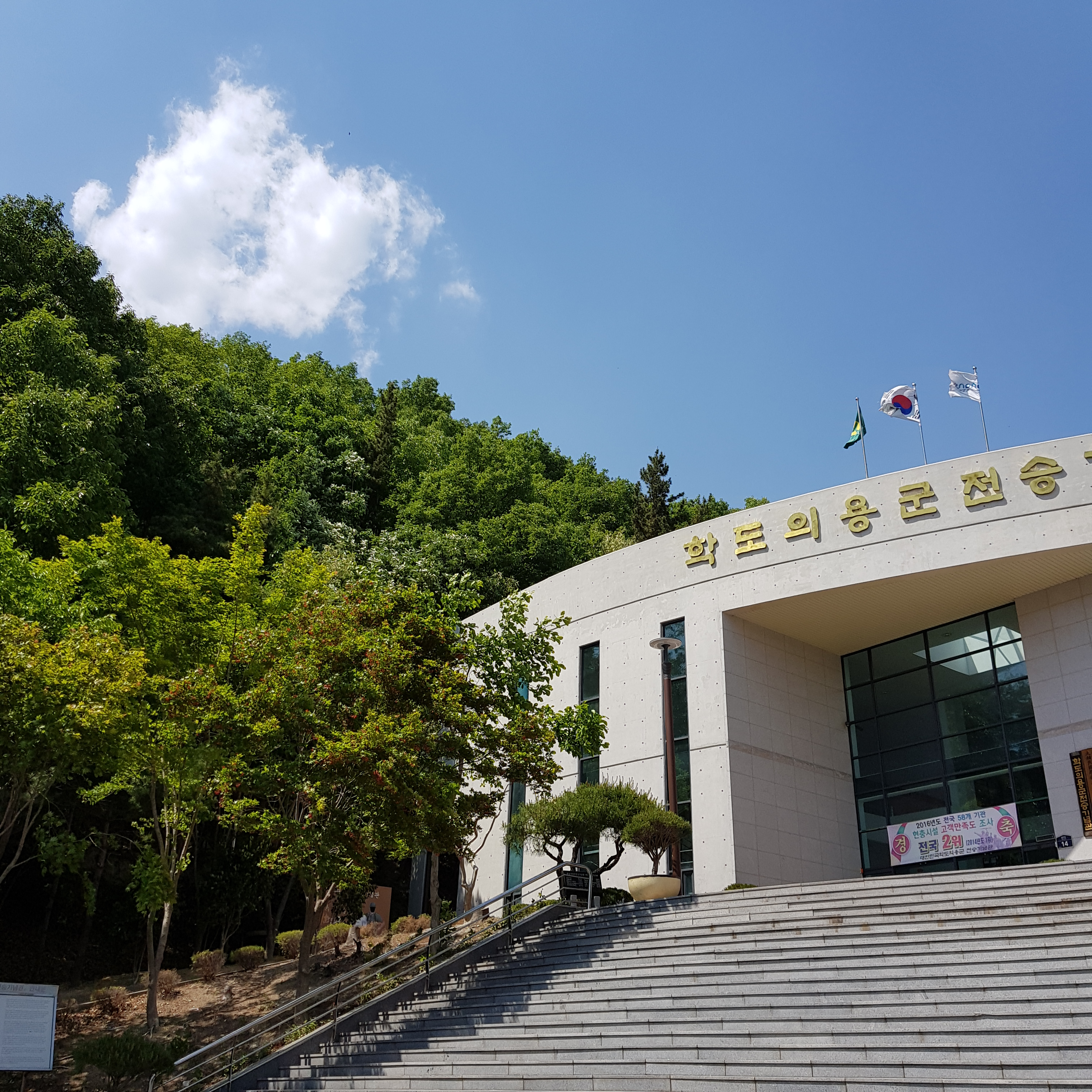
Student Soldier Memorial Hall in Pohang.

On 16, September 16, 2002, a hall was opened in Yongheung Park, No. 103, Yongheung, Buk-gu, Pohang, GyeongSangBuk-do, in honour of the students who participated in the battle of Pohang District in GyeongsangBuk-do Province during the Korean War. In the exhibition room, there are about 200 artifacts such as diaries, photographs, worn clothes, and weapons used by the municipal police officers at the time. In addition, war-related documentaries are shown in the audiovisual room.

=== Unknown Student Volunteer Forces Tower ===
This tower is located at Seoul National Cemetery. In this tower, the remains of 48 unknown soldiers, who were killed in Pohang district during the Korean War were buried in a hemispherical grave. In many cases, the bodies of those who were killed could not be found.

The 48 people here were those who were killed during the battle of Pohang against the North Korean army. At the time, these people were buried near Pohang Girls' High School. Later, the Cabinet decided to put them in the army cemetery. The Korea Student Soldier Fellowship moved them to the 5th Cemetery of the Korea Army Cemetery and then in April 1968 April, to the School Academic Unknown Soldier tower.

The tower was erected on October 30, 1954, as the "Unknown Soldier", but was renamed as "Nameless Tower" by laying down a representative unnamed warrior on January 16, 1956. In April 1968, the body of a representative unnamed warrior was converted into a crypt and the tower was relocated to its present location. Forty-eight unnamed volunteers were stationed at the back of the tower, and the altar was moved to this place, marked as the "Grave of the Student Soldier." The name of the tower was also changed to "Unknown Student Soldier Tower".

The tower is made up of three arched doors. There is an Unknown Student Volunteer Forces tower in the middle of a large door. In the center of the back of the tower is the hemispherical grave made of square granite stone. The stone of this tower is pentagonal, its surface is of sulfur grade, and the arch itself of granite. The height of the tower is 3.6m, the width is 8m, the height of the central gate is 5.5m, the height of the left and right door is 3 m, and the floor area of granite is 165 m^{2}.

== Awards and compensation ==
Since 1968, the Government of South Korea has awarded the students national merits. In January 1967, 317 people who could prove they met the criteria were handed the award. In 1997, the government handed it out to a further 45 people who had failed to receive it before.

== In the popular culture ==
- 71: Into the Fire: released on 16 June 2010, This film depicted of the Battle of P'ohang-dong during the Korean War
- The Battle of Jangsari: released on 25 September 2019, This film depicted of the Battle of Jangsari during the Korean War.

== Books ==
- Research of Student Volunteer Forces - South Korean Institute for Military History
- Sourcebook of Student Volunteer Forces - South Korean Institute for Military History
