= 71: Into the Fire =

- Theatrical release poster
- Hangul: 포화 속으로
- Hanja: 砲火 속으로
- RR: Pohwa sogeuro
- MR: P'ohwa sogŭro
- Directed by: John H. Lee (Lee Jae-han)
- Written by: Lee Man-hee; Kim Dong-woo; John H. Lee; Jeong Tae-won
- Produced by: Choi Myeong-gi; Jeong Tae-won
- Starring: Cha Seung-won; Kwon Sang-woo; Choi Seung-hyun; Kim Seung-woo
- Cinematography: Choi Chan-min
- Edited by: Choi Min-yeong; Kim Chang-ju
- Music by: Lee Dong-joon
- Production company: Taewon Entertainment
- Distributed by: Lotte Entertainment
- Release date: June 16, 2010
- Running time: 120 minutes
- Country: South Korea
- Language: Korean
- Box office: US$42.1 million

71: Into the Fire (Korean: 포화 속으로) is a 2010 South Korean war drama film directed by John H. Lee and starring Cha Seung-won, Kwon Sang-woo, Choi Seung-hyun, and Kim Seung-woo. The film was made in commemoration of those who fought during the Korean War.

The film is based on a true story of a group of 71 undertrained and underarmed, outgunned student volunteer soldiers of South Korea during the Korean War, who were mostly killed on August 11, 1950, during the Battle of P'ohang-dong. For 11 hours, they defended the local P'ohang girls' middle school, a strategic point for safeguarding the struggling Nakdong River perimeter, from an attack by overwhelming North Korean forces, specifically the feared 766th Unit.

== Plot ==
South Korean student Oh Jang-beom is a volunteer militia soldier in a battle inside Yeongdeok, North Gyeongsang during the Korean War. As the city is overrun by the 766th Unit of the Korean People's Army's 5th Division, he is pulled into a squad of South Korean soldiers led by Lieutenant Kim Jun-Seop attempting escape. However, the unit is eventually cut down to only Lt. Kim and Jang-Beom. A North Korean suddenly shoots and bayonets the lieutenant; Jang-beom, due to his inexperience and terror, is unable to save him. They are found by other South Koreans, and barely get aboard one of the last trucks out of the town to a hospital in Pohang, where Lt. Kim dies with a guilt-ridden Jang-beom at his side.

Capt. Kang orders Jang-beom to lead a newly-raised Student Volunteer Forces, as he is one of only three of the volunteers with combat experience. The unit is joined by three young criminals led by Ku Kap-jo, who challenges Jang-beom's command, and accidentally destroys the students' food supply. Later, while patrolling, they are attacked by a KPA sniper who leads them into an ambush. The students suffer heavy casualties before disengaging. The students' morale is decimated by the disastrous encounter. The students call Capt. Kang for aid, but the regular forces are pinned at the Nakdong River. Kang pleads with his superiors to help the students, but they refuse to divert resources from the critical Pusan front. They do, however, allow Kang to go, and he gathers vehicles and a small force of South Korean soldiers to relieve the school.

One of the student-soldiers, Dal-Young, is captured by the 766th Unit and is interrogated by Major Park Mu-Rang. Mu-Rang takes pity on the student and orders his return to the school, going there himself to assess the students' strength. There, he tells Jang-Beom that he and his men will, in 2 hours, capture the school, and offers to spare the defenders' lives if they raise a white flag. Kap-Jo beats Dal-young and fights Jang-beom before deserting with a friend, Chang-wu, for the Pusan Perimeter. Shortly after leaving, the two encounter a North Korean truck filled with supplies and weapons, stuck in a road.

The remaining students prepare to defend the school, raising not a white flag but the South Korean national flag, while Major Park makes his own preparations for the assault. When the attack begins, the students are able to inflict devastating casualties on the North Koreans, but are eventually forced back. Suddenly, the North Korean supply truck roars in, driven by Chang-wu and Kap-jo, carving their way through the North Koreans, halting their attack as well as bringing valuable heavy weapons to the students.

Under the cover of a tank, the 766th's men reach the school building and kill off most of the students. Jang-Beom and Kap-Jo fight their way through the North Koreans inside the building to the roof of the building, where the others have fitted machine-guns. On the roof, Jang-beom and Kap-jo try to hold back the North Koreans.

Just as Jang-beom and Kap-jo run out of ammunition, Capt. Kang and the South Koreans arrive. They destroy the North Korean tank and steadily defeat the North Korean infantry in the school grounds. At the roof, as Jang-beom collapses from exhaustion and his wounds, Major Park arrives and kills Kap-jo. While Park gloats, Jang-beom quietly loads his rifle and shoots Park just as Park also shoots him. The Major is later killed by Capt. Kang. Jang-Beom dies from his wounds as Kang comforts him.

It is revealed that of the 71 students, 48 died defending the school. The movie ends with a flashback, with an Army photographer taking a group picture of the student-soldiers before the regular troops leave for Pusan, and the surviving student-soldier veterans, now old, reflect on their experiences.

== Cast ==
- Cha Seung-won as Major Park Moo-rang
- Kwon Sang-woo as Ku Kap-Jo
- Choi Seung-hyun as Oh Jang-beom
- Kim Seung-woo as Captain Kang Seok-dae
- Park Jin-hee as the nurse
- Ronald G. Roman as Maj Gen John H. Church
- Kim Sung-ryung as Jang-beom's mother
- Yeom Hye-ran as nurse

== Production and release ==
The film's first working title was 71, then Into the Gunfire. Filming began on December 1, 2009, with help from Ministry of National Defense (T.O.P. was injured during the filming), and finished on April 13, 2010.

The film opened in South Korean theaters on June 16, 2010. It was released on DVD and Blu-ray by Cine Asia on March 14, 2011.

== Reception ==
During its theatrical run, the film drew 3,358,960 admissions at the South Korean box office, making it South Korea's fifth highest-grossing film of 2010.

=== Awards ===
- 2010 Icheon Chunsa Film Festival: Jury Prize (71: Into The Fire)
- 2010 Grand Bell Awards: Korean Wave Popularity Award (Choi Seung-hyun)
- 2010 Blue Dragon Film Awards: Best New Actor, Most Popular Actor (Choi Seung-hyun)
- 2011 Baeksang Arts Awards: Best New Actor, Most Popular Actor (Choi Seung-hyun)

== See also ==
- Battle of P'ohang-dong
- The Battle of Jangsari
