= The Battle of Jangsari =

2019 Korean War film by Kwak Kyung-taek

- Official poster
- Directed by: Kwak Kyung-taek; Kim Tae-hoon
- Written by: Lee Man-Hee; Jung Tae-won
- Produced by: Kim Sung-mi; Kim Dong-won; Jung Tae-won
- Starring: Kim Myung-min; Megan Fox; Choi Min-ho; Kim Sung-cheol; Kim In-kwon; Kwak Si-yang
- Cinematography: Kim Sung-hwan
- Edited by: Kim Chang-ju; Kim Woo-hyun
- Music by: Mok Yeong-jin
- Production companies: Taewon Entertainment; Film 295; Finecut
- Distributed by: Warner Bros. Pictures
- Release date: September 25, 2019
- Running time: 103 minutes
- Country: South Korea
- Languages: Korean; English
- Box office: $7.8 million

The Battle of Jangsari (Korean: 장사리: 잊혀진 영웅들; RR: jangsari: icheojin yeongungdeul; lit. Jangsari: Forgotten Heroes) is a 2019 South Korean action-war film co-directed by Kwak Kyung-taek and Kim Tae-hoon, starring Kim Myung-min, Megan Fox, and Choi Min-ho in the lead roles.

The second installment in a trilogy following Operation Chromite, the film depicts the September 14–15, 1950 Battle of Jangsari and tells the true story of the Independent 1st Guerrilla Battalion (estimated strength: 718–772) of student volunteer soldiers led by ROK Army officers, including Captain Lee Myung-heum), who staged a small diversionary operation at Jangsari beach in Yeongdeok.

The main mission was to block the supply route and therefore to achieve disruption of the North Korean Army around the Pusan Perimeter by hit-and-run tactics and the secondary mission was a diversion to draw the North Korean Army's attention, to facilitate the success of the Incheon landing.

Megan Fox plays the role of Maggie, an American reporter and war correspondent for the New York Herald Tribune, who covered the Korean War and called on the international community for assistance. Kim Myung-min plays a guerrilla task force commander while Choi Min-ho plays a low-ranking soldier. George Eads plays the leader of the landing operation. The film was released theatrically in South Korea on 25 September 2019 and in the U.S. on 4 October 2019.

== Synopsis ==
During the Korean War, the Independent 1st Guerrilla Battalion is tasked with staging a diversionary mission at Jangsari Beach in South Korea, in order to deceive the North Korean forces into thinking the opposition forces would launch a decisive invasion there. In doing so, they would be able to pave the way for the success of Incheon Landing. Meanwhile, an American reporter and war correspondent (Megan Fox) covers the Korean War and tries to get help from the international community as the soldiers struggle to accomplish their mission due to a lack of proper training, weapons, and adequate food and supplies.

== Cast ==
- Kim Myung-min as Lee Myung-joon (based on commander Captain Lee Myung-heum)
- Megan Fox as Maggie (fictional character based on Marguerite Higgins and Margaret Bourke-White)
- Choi Min-ho as Choi Sung-pil
- Kim Sung-cheol as Ki Ha-ryun
- Kim In-kwon as Ryu Tae-seok
- Kwak Si-yang as Park Chan-nyeon
- Jang Ji-gun as Guk Man-deuk
- Lee Ho-jung as Moon Jong-nyeo
- Lee Jae-wook as Lee Gae-tae
- Go Geon-han as Choi Jae-pil
- Dong Bang-woo as General Lim Choon-bong
- George Eads as Colonel Stephen
- Jeong Jong-jun as Guk Man-deuk (old)
- Kim Min-kyu as Choi Jae-pil
- Choi Jae-pil as North Korean army general
- Han Chul-woo as Moonsan ship captain
- Jang Myung-kab as Jochiwon ship captain
- Baek Shin as Myung troops officer 1
- Oh Gyu-chul as village North Korean army soldier 2
- Daniel Joey Albright as U.S. Navy sailor 2

== Filming ==
Principal photography commenced on 3 October 2018 and was completed on 12 January 2019.

== Release ==
Produced by Taewon Entertainment and distributed by Warner Bros. Korea, the film was released theatrically in South Korea on 25 September 2019 in 1,090 South Korean theaters.

It was released in U.S. on 4 October 2019 by Well Go USA.

== Reception ==
Yoon Min-sik from The Korea Herald praised the opening sequence, the subsequent 40 minutes and how the film managed to introduce the main characters and their traits without feeling forced while also depicting the gritty, grotesque face of war. However, the reviewer felt the plot was "too contrived", Fox's character spelt out the director's message through her dialogue, and that the film started out as something like Saving Private Ryan and ended up along the lines of Pearl Harbor.

== Box office ==
Opening alongside By Quantum Physics: A Nightlife Venture, the film debuted at the number one position and sold over 485,000 tickets (US$3.44 million) through the weekend and a total of 690,000 tickets (US$4.57 million) in its first five days.

== Awards and nominations ==
Year	Award	Category	Recipient	Result	Ref.
2019	40th Blue Dragon Film Awards	Best New Actor	Kim Sung-cheol	Nominated	
2019	27th Korean Culture and Entertainment Awards	Best New Actor in a Film	Kim Sung-cheol	Won	
2019	27th Korean Culture and Entertainment Awards	Best Supporting Actor in a Film	Jang Ji-Gun	Won	
2021	40th Golden Cinematography Awards	Jury's Special Prize	Choi Min-ho	Won	

== See also ==
- 71: Into the Fire
