= Ilwolsan =

Mountain in South Korea

Irwolsan

Highest point
- Elevation: 1,219 m (3,999 ft)

Geography
- Location: North Gyeongsang Province, South Korea

Irwolsan is a mountain of North Gyeongsang Province, eastern South Korea. It has an elevation of 1,219 metres.

== See also ==
- List of mountains of Korea
