= John H. Lee (director) =

South Korean filmmaker (born 1971)

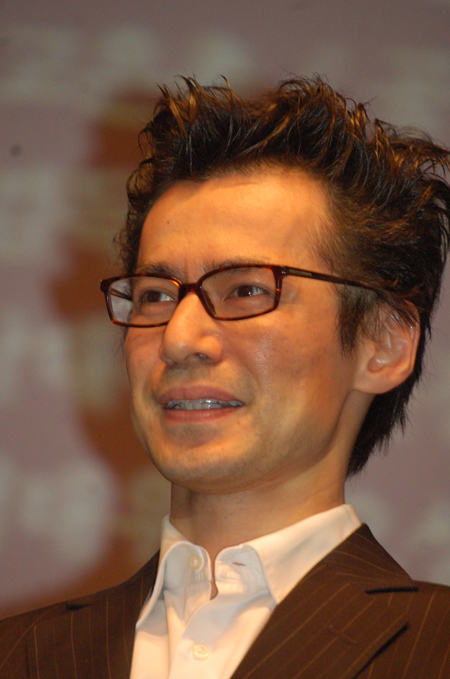
- Born: Lee Jae-han; 1971 (age 54–55); Seoul, South Korea
- Education: New York University
- Occupations: Film director, screenwriter

Korean name
- Hangul: 이재한
- Hanja: 李宰漢
- RR: I Jaehan
- MR: I Chaehan

Lee Jae-han (Korean: 이재한; born 1971), also known as John H. Lee, is a South Korean film director and screenwriter. Lee studied filmmaking at New York University. Although making films of different genres each time, his directing talent, chic and sensuous, runs through all his works. Since his debut in 2000, he has made several box office successes such as A Moment to Remember (2004), Sayonara Itsuka (2010), 71: Into the Fire (2010) and Operation Chromite (2016).

== Filmography ==
- The Cut Runs Deep (2000) - director, screenwriter, editor
- History of BoA 2000–2002 (video, 2003) - director
- A Moment to Remember (2004) - director, screenwriter
- Goodbye, Someday (2010) - director, screenwriter
- 71: Into the Fire (2010) - director, screenwriter
- The Third Way of Love (2015) - director
- Operation Chromite (2016) - director
- See Hear Love (2023) - director, screenwriter
