= 5th Division (North Korea) =

5th Infantry Division
- Active: July 1949 - ?
- Country: North Korea
- Allegiance: Korean People's Army
- Branch: Korean People's Army Ground Force
- Type: Infantry division
- Engagements: Korean War

The 5th Infantry Division was a military formation of the Korean People's Army during the 20th century.

== History ==
=== China ===
164th Division (1948–49)
- Active: 1948.11 - 1949.6
- Country: People's Republic of China
- Branch: People's Liberation Army
- Type: Division
- Role: Infantry
- Part of: Fourth Field Army
- Engagements: Chinese Civil War

The 164th Division (Chinese: 第164师) was created in November 1948 under the Regulation of the Redesignations of All Organizations and Units of the Army, issued by Central Military Commission on November 1, 1948, basing on the 11th Independent Division, PLA Northeastern Field Army. The 164th Division was a Korean unit, composing of basically Korean soldiers.

The division was under direct control of PLA Fourth Field Army. Under the flag of 164th division it took part in the Chinese Civil War, especially in the Siege of Changchun. In July 1949, the division was disbanded, and its 10821 Korean soldiers moved to North Korea, where it was re-organized as 5th Division of the Korean People's Army. Its Chinese soldiers stayed and later re-organized as 6th Artillery Division along with other units.

As of its disbandment the division was composed of:

- 490th Regiment;
- 491st Regiment;
- 492nd Regiment.

=== North Korea ===
Around mid-February 1950 the division began to receive new recruits, numbering approximately 1,000 men between the ages of 18 and 26 years, until it got up to full strength.

On June 19, 1950, leading elements of the division were said to have departed Nanam by rail for Yangyang, where they arrived by June 23; by June 25 the movement of the division's combat elements had been completed. The 10th Regiment, which was the first to assemble at Yangyang, allegedly departed south immediately after its arrival and backpacked into the vicinity of the 38th Parallel. It was followed in short order by the other two infantry regiments and on the night of June 24, the 5th Division, with the exception of a few rear echelon units still en route, was reportedly deployed along the 38th Parallel south of Yangyang.

At approximately 0500 hours on June 25, 1950, the 5th Division lunged across the 38th Parallel in an offensive down the main road that parallels Korea's rugged east coast. The division's drive was allegedly supported by the 766th Independent Infantry Regiment, an organization with a strength of 1,500 men which appears to have been part of a larger amphibious force under the direct control of the North Korean Army's General headquarters in Pyongyang.

The 5th Division in two weeks of heavy battles forged its way toward Yongdok and finally captured the town on or about August 3, after sustaining prohibitive casualties. During the siege, the 10th Regiment allegedly pressed the attack from the west and fought its way into the outskirts two or three times, but was forced to withdraw each time under withering artillery and small-arms fire. In its drive on Yongdok the division is said to have been subjected to almost constant bombardment from UN aircraft and naval vessels; even at night the troops were apparently not given any respite, for prisoners complained that artillery opened up with heavy fire after the naval and air attacks ceased. To illustrate the terrific casualties that the division sustained in these battles, one POW related that in a single naval barrage 700 men were killed and huge stores of supplies and equipment were destroyed. Altogether the 5th Division is estimated to have suffered a 40% reduction in strength in the battle for Yongdok.

For the next few days the division remained in Yongdok to reorganize and receive replacements. Approximately 1,200 new men were reportedly assigned to the three infantry regiments, bringing them up to about 50% of strength. These replacements were all North Koreans with about three weeks training who had been marching for fully 15 days before joining the division.

By August 12, the 5th Division had pressed to Pohang-dong and also threatened Yonil Airfield. The division had cut off the ROK 3rd Division above Pohang-dong, and the 3rd Division had to be evacuated by sea to positions farther south. After a two-day artillery barrage, the division purportedly attacked Pohang-dong with all three regiments committed, and occupied the town on August 20, 1950, after a fierce engagement that resulted in heavy casualties, most of which were caused by intense artillery fire. While in the city, the troops are reported to have been subjected to constant air and artillery bombardment. On or about August 23, 1950, American and ROK troops launched a counterattack, which forced the division to withdraw about 5 miles to the north and received such heavy casualties that its strength was reduced to about 4,000 men. From August 23 to September 3, the division reportedly remained in defensive positions just north of Pohang-dong. During this period approximately 3,000 replacements were received, most of whom were conscripted from South Korea and assigned to the division without any previous military training. Because of the general shortage of weapons, many of these men were only issued grenades and instructed to pick up the rifles of their comrades as they fell on the battlefield.

On September 3, the division resumed its attack with the objective of taking Pohang-dong and the Yonil Airfield south of the town. By the following day the 5th Division succeeded in breaking through the outer defenses of UN forces and fought ferociously through a hail of artillery and small-arms fire. They finally entered the town on September 6, but before they could consolidate their gains the UN forces counterattacked and once again forced the division to withdraw and take up defensive positions just north of the town. For several days they fought an artillery duel and sent out combat patrols. Late in the evening of the September 11, the division advanced toward the southwest, skirting the outer fringes of the UN defenses, and deployed along the high ground overlooking Pohang-dong for another assault on the town. The 11th and 12th Regiments were poised for an attack from the west, while the 10th Regiment occupied assault positions approximately 2.5 miles southwest of Pohang-dong. During the night large amounts of ammunition were carried to gun positions and last-minute preparations were made. On September 12, 1950, UN forces began laying a heavy artillery concentration on positions held by the 10th Regiment and later in the day the 11th and 12th Regiments were likewise engaged by artillery. Soon after, all three regiments were attacked heavily by UN aircraft which wrought considerable damage and disrupted all plans for the attack.

Beginning on September 14, 1950, the division was ordered to withdraw from their heavily shelled positions and to regroup in the vicinity of Chongha. When the last elements had withdrawn to the assembly area by September 16, the division was deployed along the Tosong-Dong-Chongha road in well dug-in positions designed primarily to afford protection against the dreaded air attacks which only the day before had blown up the entire ammunition dump of the division artillery. Since the division had been reduced to approximately 50% of its original strength by this time, it remained in this locality, reorganizing and receiving replacements totalling about 1,200 men. On September 21, 1950, the 5th Division was hit by the full weight of the all-out UN offensive launched in coordination with the successful amphibious operation at Inchon.

After the UN breakout from the Pusan Perimeter, fierce battles were fought in the harbor village of Pohang-dong between the ROK 3rd Division and the 5th Division. The 3rd finally captured the village during the morning of 20 September. They continued to attack aggressively, and on September 22, 1950, forced a disorderly withdrawal by the 5th toward Yongdok, where they were once more taken under heavy fire by UN naval vessels. Under orders to withdraw farther north the division left Yongdok on about September 24 with a remaining strength of about 2,400 men. Marching in groups of platoon size and maintaining intervals of about 5 miles between regiments during daytime, the division retraced its route of advance along the coast and arrived at Anbyon on about November 3, 1950. While retreating, several bands of stragglers joined the column en route, boosting its strength to approximately 3,000 men.

On October 26, three battalions of the 5th Division had silently crept close to the hill positions of the 1st Battalion, 1st Marine Regiment, guarding a supply dump near Kojo. They attacked so swiftly at one platoon position that fifteen marines were killed there - seven in their sleeping bags. Before noon of the 28th, the 5th Division moved off west into the hills and the fight was over. The marines recovered their dead and counted their losses — 27 killed, 39 wounded and 3 missing.

The division arrived in Cheongpyeong on November 8, 1950, and after joining forces with remnants of the 2nd Division, appears to have proceeded, through Hamhung where it swung inland, finally proceeding north along a road that parallels the Tabdong River. On November 18, elements of the greatly diminished 5th Division, with a remaining strength of only 500 troops were seen passing through Sachang-ni moving in a northerly direction.

== Composition ==
The 5th Infantry Division was composed of the 10th Infantry Regiment, 11th Infantry Regiment, 12th Infantry Regiment, 5th Artillery Regiment and various unidentified support units.
