= Typhoon Kezia =

Pacific typhoon in 1950

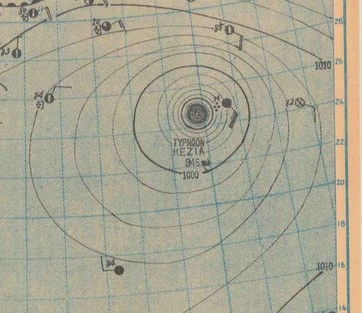
- Surface weather analysis of Typhoon Kezia near peak intensity on September 10

Meteorological history
- Formed: September 4, 1950
- Extratropical: September 15, 1950
- Dissipated: September 16, 1950

Category 3-equivalent typhoon
- 1-minute sustained (SSHWS/JTWC)
- Highest winds: 185 km/h (115 mph)

Super typhoon
- 2-minute sustained (CMA)
- Highest winds: 215 km/h (135 mph)
- Lowest pressure: 945 hPa (mbar); 27.91 inHg

Overall effects
- Fatalities: 25
- Areas affected: Japan
- IBTrACS
- Part of the 1950 Pacific typhoon season

Typhoon Kezia was an intense tropical cyclone which struck the southern part of Japan in September 1950. The eighth named storm of the 1950 Pacific typhoon season, Kezia formed north of Guam on September 4. The system's wind speed increased steadily as it moved northwest. The peak wind speed according to the China Meteorological Administration (CMA) gave a peak wind speed of 133.49 mph (214.83 km/h). Kezia retained its peak intensity until it weakened rapidly near the coast of Japan. The storm made landfall in Kagoshima Prefecture in Kyushu on September 13 and made two more landfalls after in Hokkaido on September 14 and Kamchatka Krai on September 15 as an extratropical. It dissipated the next day. Numerous military vehicles were warned and grounded. Floods were recorded in Iwakuni and Hiroshima. The overall deaths nationally were 25.

== Meteorological history ==
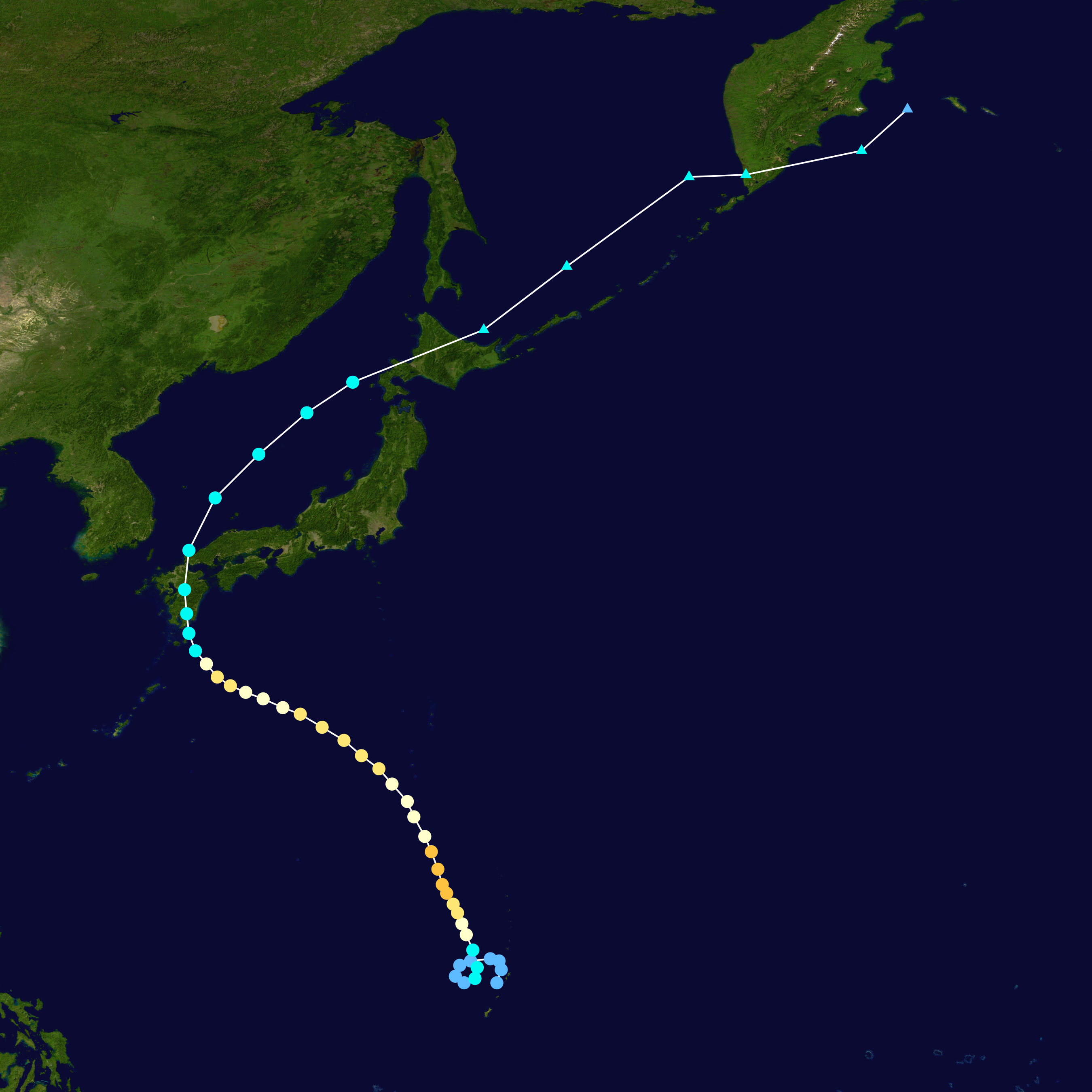
Map plotting the storm's track and intensity, according to the Saffir–Simpson scale Map key Saffir–Simpson scale Tropical depression (≤38 mph, ≤62 km/h) Tropical storm (39–73 mph, 63–118 km/h) Category 1 (74–95 mph, 119–153 km/h) Category 2 (96–110 mph, 154–177 km/h) Category 3 (111–129 mph, 178–208 km/h) Category 4 (130–156 mph, 209–251 km/h) Category 5 (≥157 mph, ≥252 km/h) Unknown Storm type Tropical cyclone Subtropical cyclone Extratropical cyclone, remnant low, tropical disturbance, or monsoon depression

Kezia formed north of Guam on September 4 with a wind speed from the CMA of 26.46 miles per hour (42.58 kilometres per hour) as a tropical depression. Shifting northwest, the depression steadily increased its wind speed and was a tropical storm on September 6. The next day, it was officially a typhoon as the Joint Typhoon Warning Center (JTWC) started monitoring the cyclone. The storm steadily grew as it started traversing more west. As September 10 started, the CMA gave a peak wind speed of 133.49 mph (214.83 km/h). The storm had a sharp curve more western while still moving north.

Over the following days, Kezia retained its peak intensity while traversing northwest. On September 12, the cyclone was in close proximity to the coast of extreme south Japan, weakening rapidly. The storm made landfall in Kagoshima Prefecture in Kyushu on September 13 at 06:00 UTC as it continued straight north. Researcher Atsushi Kimpara commented in the Journal of Geomagnetism & Geoelectricity that the storm changed its character after it passed the island, elaborating that origins of atmospherics moved to the coast of Shikoku. He also noticed the weakening of the cyclone. It continued weakening and eventually made a second landfall on the island of Hokkaido at 21:00 UTC, September 14. It continued weakening until the CMA stopped tracking it the next day; it had conflicting classifications from different agencies. In the middle of September 15, the JTWC concluded its tracking of the cyclone when it became extratropical. It made landfall in Kamchatka Krai at 18:00 UTC that same day before dissipating on September 16 at 06:00 UTC.

== Preparations and impact ==
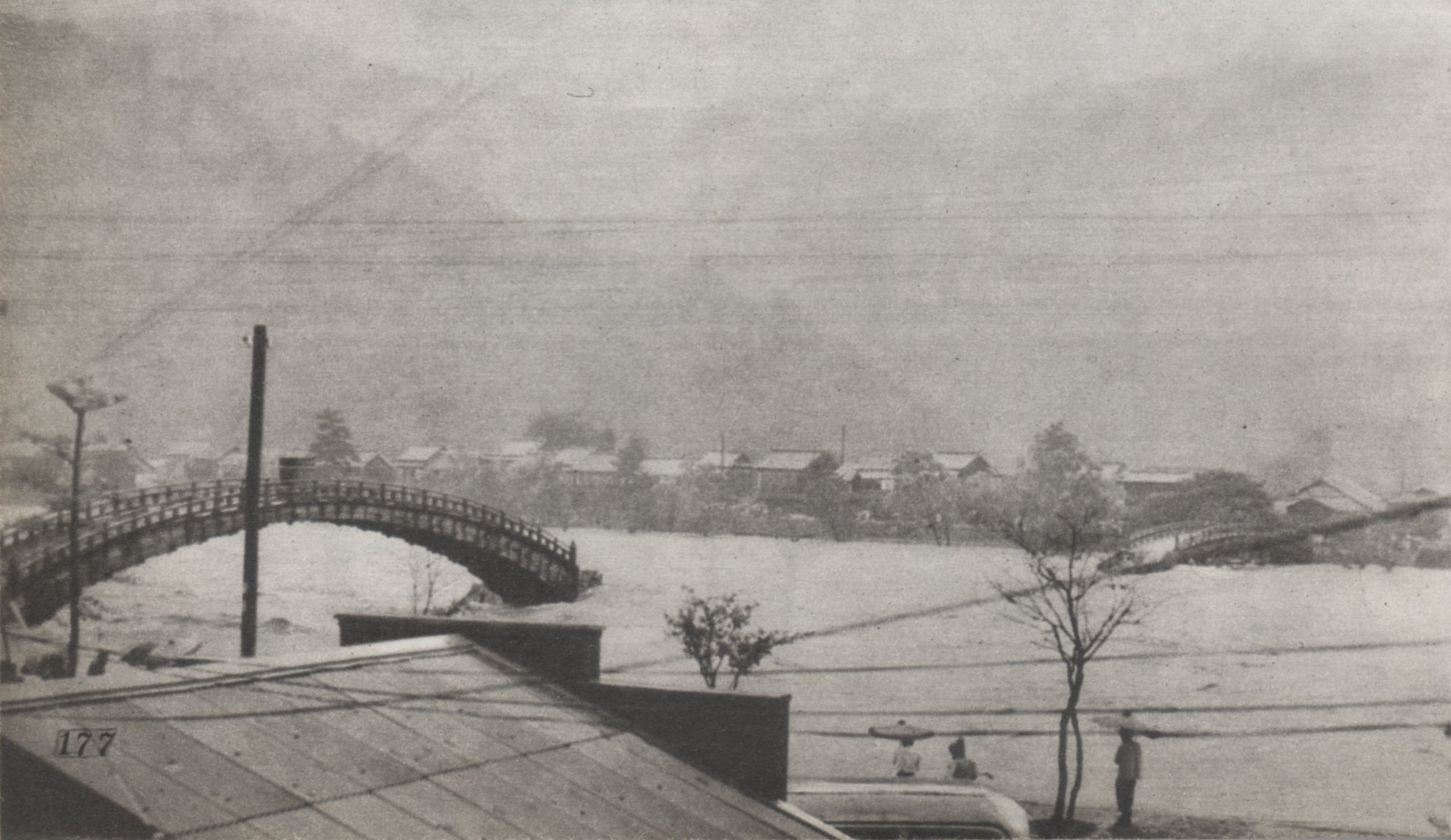
The Kintai bridge which was destroyed by floods caused by Kezia.

Ships of the United States Navy were alerted and secured due to Typhoon Kezia. Numerous aircraft of the No. 77 Squadron RAAF were grounded at Iwakuni. The squadrons station was hit by the typhoon causing damage. The Nishiki River rose high due to the storm, causing citizens to try to prevent flooding. In the river, multiple bridges were destroyed including the Kintai Bridge in Iwakuni. Major damage was inflicted in Hiroshima. Most rivers in the city recorded a water level 50 centimetres (20 inches) higher than normal while some recorded a water level 80 cm (31 in) higher. Numerous bridges in the city collapsed due to overflowing rivers. Approximately 3,216 buildings were flooded under the floor including one middle school and two factories; 80 were flooded above floor. An estimated 19 houses collapsed while 46 were partly damaged. The storm caused zero casualties in Hiroshima. According to a report by the Ministry of Land, Infrastructure, Transport and Tourism, the storm caused 25 deaths nationally.
