= 3rd Infantry Division (South Korea) =

Military unit, Republic of Korea Army

- 제3보병사단
- 3rd Infantry Division insignia
- Founded: May 12, 1949
- Country: South Korea
- Branch: Republic of Korea Army
- Type: Infantry
- Size: Division
- Part of: V Corps
- Garrison/HQ: Cheorwon County, Gangwon Province
- Nickname: 백골 (Baek-Gol / White Skull)
- Colors: White, Blue
- March: 3rd Division Hymn
- Engagements: Korean War; Operation Pokpung; Battle of the Pusan Perimeter; Battle of Kyongju; Pusan Perimeter offensive; UN Forces September 1950 counteroffensive; UN offensive into North Korea; Second Phase Offensive; UN Forces retreat from North Korea

Commanders
- Current commander: Maj. Gen. Park Jin-hee
- Notable commanders: Maj. Gen. Lee Ung-jun; Maj. Gen. Park Chung-in

The 3rd Infantry Division (Korean: 제3보병사단, Hanja: 第三步兵師團) is a military formation of the South Korean army.

== History ==
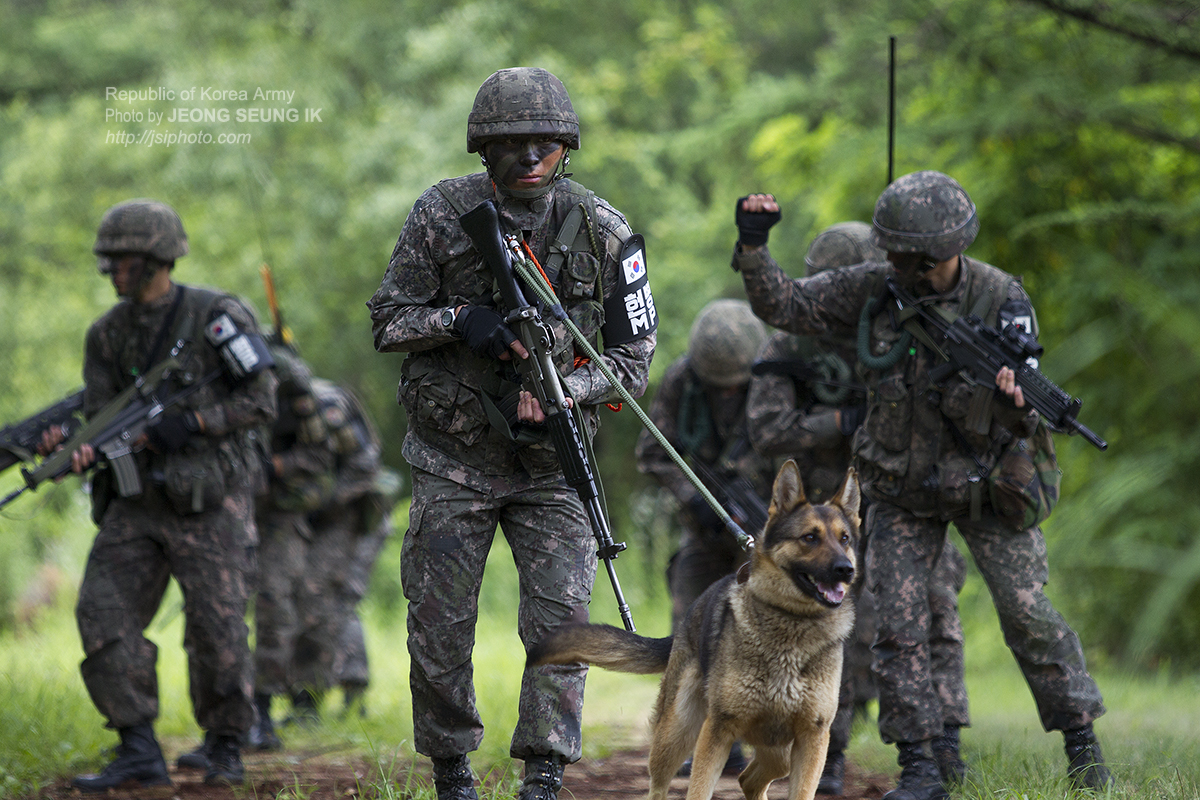
3rd Infantry Division's reconnaissance squad patrols near the DMZ.

First formed as the 3rd brigade on December 1, 1947. On December 24, 1949, the division conducted the Mungyeong massacre.

The unit was upgraded to a division on May 12, 1949. On June 25, 1950, the North Korean army began to invade South Korea during the outbreak of war. The division was under the direct control of the Republic of Korea Army after the first fall of Seoul. It became part of the defensive line to slow the North Korean advance from Seoul to Daejeon. It also fought in the Battle of Pusan Perimeter. After the breakout from the Pusan Perimeter, fierce battles were fought in the harbor village of Pohang between the 3rd Division and the NKPA's 5th Division. The 3rd finally captured the village during the morning of September 20, 1950. They continued to attack aggressively, forcing a disorderly withdrawal by the NKPA toward Yongdok. During the course of the war, the 3rd Infantry Division took part in over 150 battles, killing and capturing more than 51,000 enemy soldiers. It is also known as the invincible unit because it has never lost a single battle.

Since 1991 the division has maintained a traditional guard of honor unit at the Gyeongbokgung in Seoul to perform ceremonial duties, such as welcoming heads of state and changing of the guard. The unit performs a historical re-enactment of the ceremony and don traditional attire and weaponry. The unit was created after president Roh Tae-woo reviewed the Old Guard Fife and Drum Corps and the Commander-in-Chief's Guard of the 3rd U.S. Infantry Regiment during his visit to the White House that year and decided that the South Korean army should have a unit for similar functions. The first ceremony took place in 1996 after extensive research and consultation with historians and experts on details from commands used to accessories and attire worn.

== Current structure ==
- Headquarters:
  - Headquarters Company
  - Anti-Tank Company
  - DMZ Patrol Company
  - Air Defense Company
  - Armor Battalion
  - Signal Battalion
  - Reconnaissance Battalion
  - Engineer Battalion
  - Support Battalion
  - Medical Battalion
  - Chemical Battalion
- 18th Infantry Brigade
- 22nd Infantry Brigade
- 23rd Infantry Brigade
- Artillery Brigade (equipped with K9 Thunder SPHs)
