= General Gerow =

General Gerow may refer to:

- Lee S. Gerow (1891–1982), United States Army General, brother of Leonard T. Gerow
- Leonard T. Gerow (1888–1972), United States Army General, brother of Lee S. Gerow
