= John B. Coulter =

United States Army general (1891–1983)

John Breitling Coulter
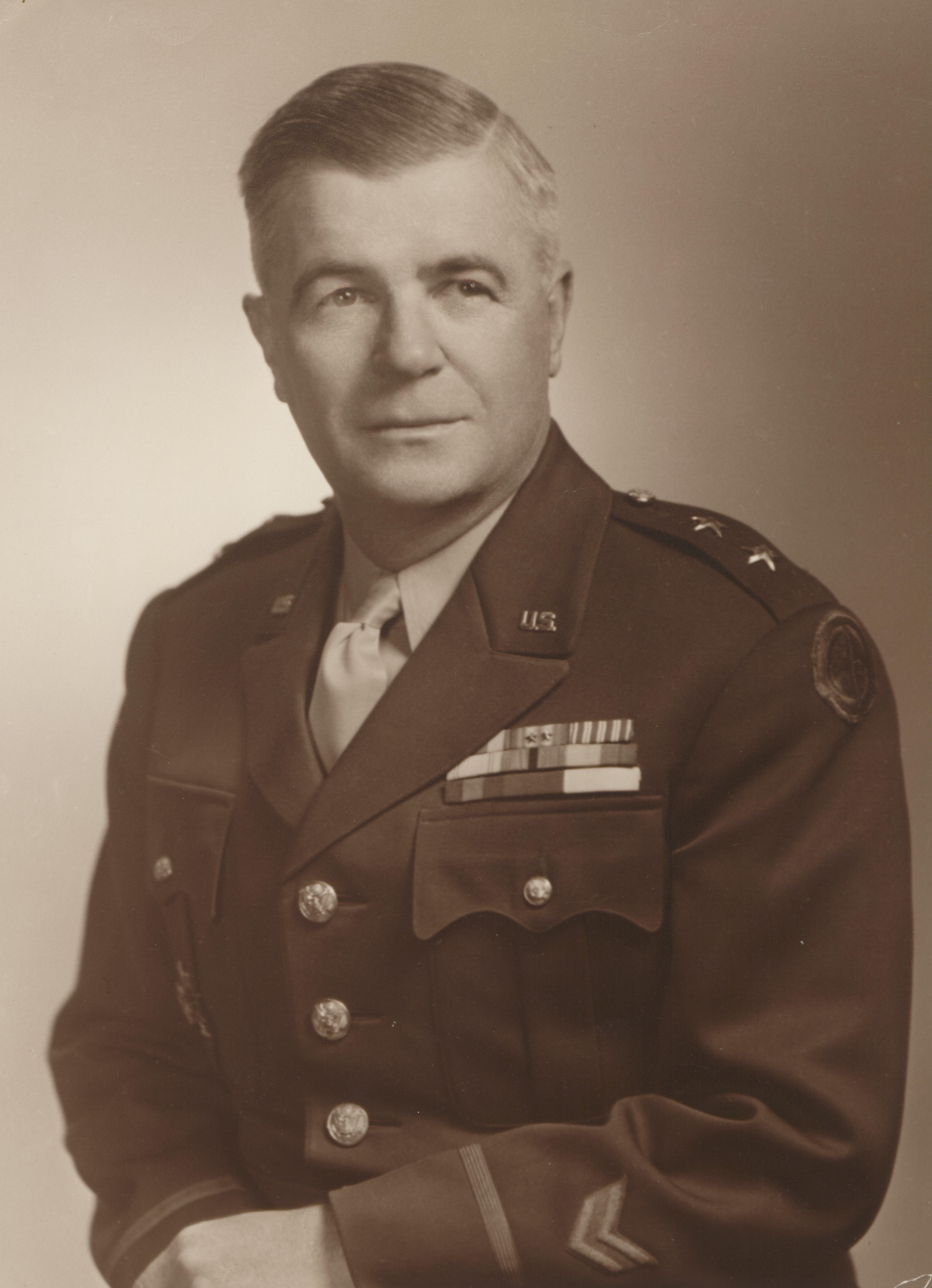
- Coulter as IX Corps Commander c. 1949
- Born: April 27, 1891; San Antonio, Texas, United States
- Died: March 6, 1983 (aged 91); Washington, D.C., United States
- Burial place: Arlington National Cemetery, Virginia, United States
- Military career
- Allegiance: United States
- Branch: United States Army
- Service years: 1912–1952
- Rank: Lieutenant General
- Unit: Cavalry Branch
- Commands: 2nd Battalion, 508th Pioneer Infantry Regiment; 4th Cavalry Regiment; 3rd Cavalry Brigade; 2nd Cavalry Division; 85th Infantry Division; 7th Infantry Division; I Corps; XXIV Corps; IX Corps
- Conflicts: Pancho Villa Expedition; World War I World War II; Korean War
- Awards: Army Distinguished Service Medal (3); Silver Star (2); Bronze Star; Distinguished Flying Cross; Air Medal

Lieutenant General John Breitling Coulter (April 27, 1891 – March 6, 1983) was a senior United States Army officer. Enjoying a distinguished 40-year military career, Coulter served during World War I, World War II and the Korean War.

== Early life and military career ==
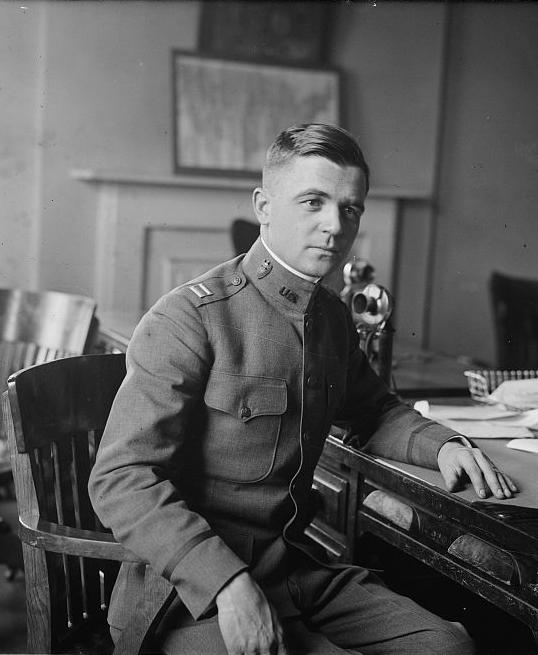
Coulter as a Captain during the First World War c. 1917–1918

Born on April 27, 1891, in San Antonio, Texas, he graduated in 1911 from West Texas Military Academy, an Episcopal preparatory school, and in 1912 obtained a commission as a second lieutenant in the Cavalry Branch of the United States Army.

He initially served with the 14th Cavalry Regiment in Texas until 1916, including participation in the Pancho Villa Expedition. After the American entry into World War I he served on the Western Front, initially as aide-de-camp to Major General William Abram Mann, then commander of the 42nd (Rainbow) Division. After returning to the United States for five months as adjutant of the 154th Brigade of the 77th Division, at Camp Meade, Maryland, he went back to France as commander of the 2nd Battalion, 508th Pioneer Infantry Regiment, an African-American unit.

== Between the wars ==
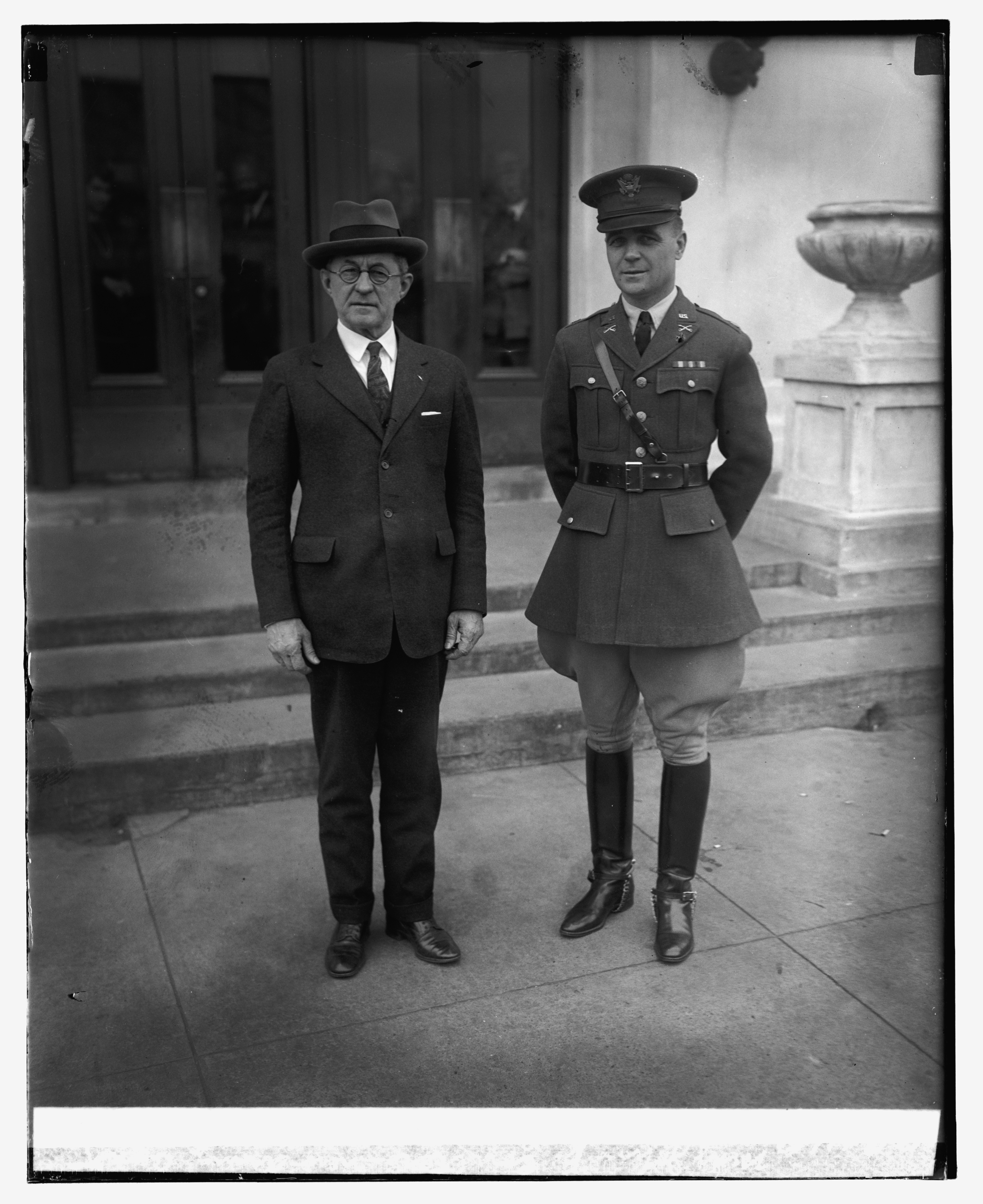
Brigadier General John B. Bellinger and Major John B. Coulter, January 30, 1926.

Remaining in the army after the war, which ended on November 11, 1918, and in the subsequent interwar period, Coulter served in the War Department's Personnel Branch, and then assumed command of the 2nd Squadron, 14th Cavalry Regiment at Fort Des Moines, Iowa. In 1922 he graduated from the U.S. Army Cavalry School and was assigned to the War Department as the Cavalry chief of materiel, later serving as executive officer (XO) to the Chief of Cavalry.

Coulter graduated from the U.S. Army Command and General Staff College in 1927, and then took command of a squadron in the 8th Cavalry Regiment at Fort Bliss, Texas, afterwards serving as assistant plans and training officer for the 1st Cavalry Division. He was subsequently assigned to the General Staff's Military Intelligence Division as a specialist in Latin American affairs.

In 1933 Coulter graduated from the U.S. Army War College, and he completed the Naval War College in 1934. He was promoted to lieutenant colonel on August 1, 1935 and was assigned as XO of the 4th Cavalry Regiment at Fort Meade, South Dakota. In December 1940 he became the regiment's commander. On June 26, 1941, he was promoted to the temporary rank of colonel.

== World War II ==
In 1941 Coulter was assigned as commander of the 3rd Cavalry Brigade in Phoenix, Arizona, receiving another temporary promotion to the one-star general officer rank of brigadier general on October 31, 1941. After the Japanese attack on Pearl Harbor in December 1941, which brought the United States into World War II, his men patrolled the Mexican border, and Coulter received an additional assignment as the Western Defense Command's commander of the Southern Land Frontier Sector. In early 1942 Coulter was briefly assigned as Commanding General (CG) of the 2nd Cavalry Division.

In May 1942 he became the Assistant Division Commander (ADC) of the 85th Infantry Division (nicknamed "The Custer Division"), one of the first conscript (or "draftee") divisions formed in the war, which had been reconstituted after World War I. The division commander was Major General Wade H. Haislip. Coulter was promoted to the permanent rank of colonel on July 1, 1942, and assumed command of the division in February 1943, after Haislip was promoted to the command of XV Corps. On March 12, 1943, Coulter again received a promotion, this time to the temporary rank of major general. Brigadier General Lee S. Gerow, the younger brother of Major General Leonard T. Gerow, succeeded Coulter as the 85th's ADC and remained in this position for the rest of the war.

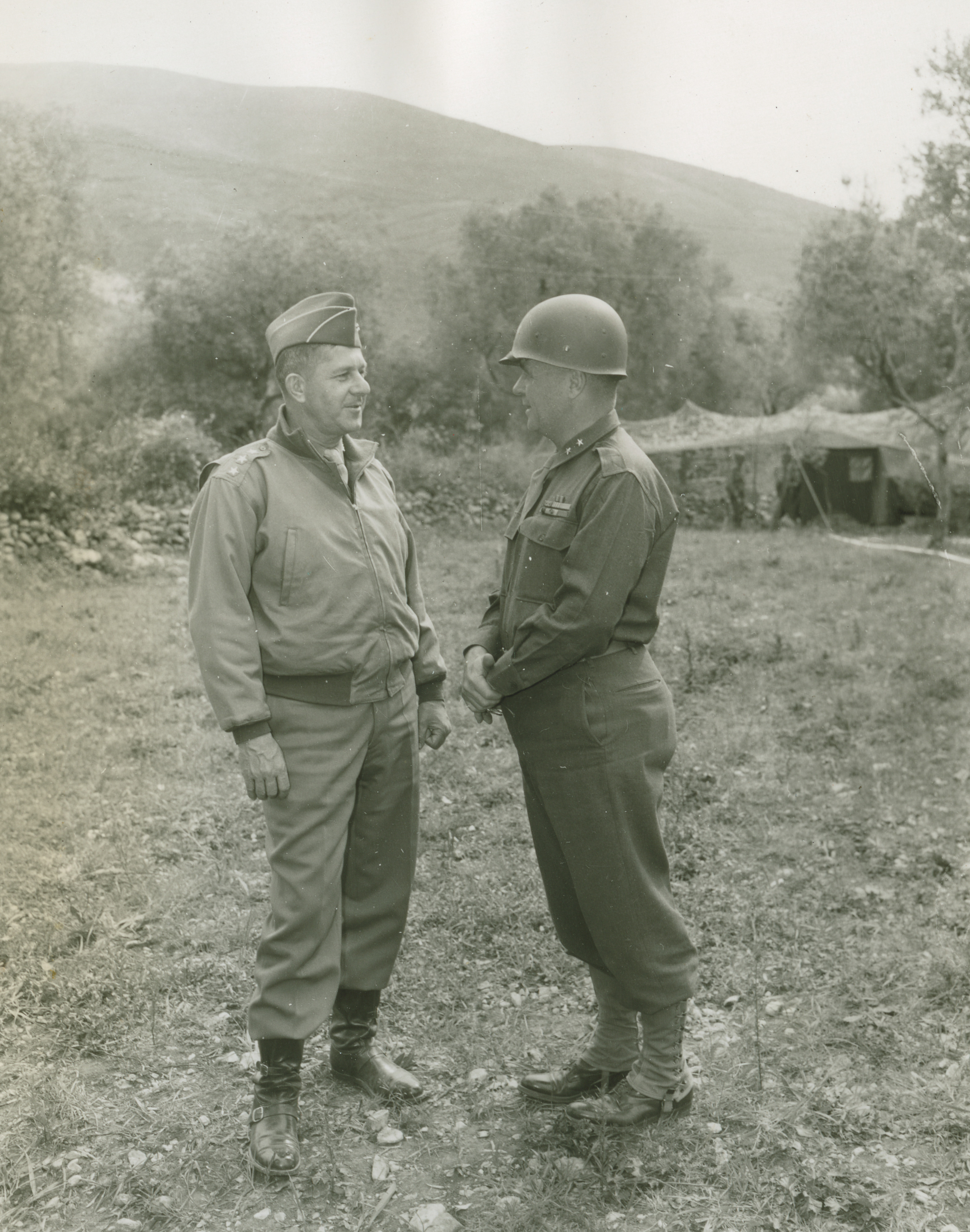
Lieutenant General Jacob L. Devers talks with Major General John B. Coulter outside a military camp in Italy, May 29, 1944.

After training throughout the United States the 85th Division left for North Africa in late 1943 and trained there until March 1944. The 85th, along with the 88th Infantry Division, was one of the first all-draftee divisions to leave the United States for overseas service. The division was sent to the Italian front in late March 1944, where it initially came under the command of II Corps, commanded by Major General Geoffrey Keyes, which itself was part of Lieutenant General Mark W. Clark's U.S. Fifth Army. Under Coulter's command, the 85th Division fought with distinction in the Fourth Battle of Monte Cassino, and later during the severe fighting around the Gothic Line, and finally in Operation Grapeshot, which brought an end to the war in Italy. During the campaign Major General Coulter earned a reputation as an expert in military mountaineering and alpine warfare.

In September 1945, with the war against both Germany and Japan over, Coulter returned to the United States as commander of the Infantry Replacement Center at Fort McClellan, Alabama, and then was assigned as deputy commander of the Fourth Army at Fort Sam Houston, Texas.

== Korea ==
In 1948 he went to Korea as commander of the 7th Infantry Division before commanding the XXIV Corps. In 1949 he was appointed deputy commander of U.S. forces in Korea, and then commanded I Corps until its deactivation in 1950. Coulter was then assigned as deputy commander of the Fifth Army, headquartered in Chicago.

After the June 1950 invasion of South Korea, which began the Korean War, Coulter was assigned to command I Corps, reactivated as part of the U.S. Eighth Army. As the commander of Task Force Jackson, an ad hoc force of South Korean and U.S. troops, Coulter was credited with a key role in halting North Korea's advance. In September, 1950 Coulter assumed command of IX Corps, and led his organization as the supporting effort to I Corps in the U.S. counterattack against North Korea. According to American historian Clay Blair, catastrophic results ensued on the battle field due to Coulter's mistaken faith in the Turkish Brigade's fighting prowess since Coulter was as deceived as the war correspondents regarding fighting abilities of the Turks, whom Blair called "poorly led green troops".

In 1951 Coulter was promoted to lieutenant general as deputy commander of the Eighth Army, and was Eighth Army commander General Matthew Ridgway's liaison to the South Korean Army and South Korean President, Syngman Rhee. Coulter retired from the army, after 40 years service, in 1952.

== Later life ==
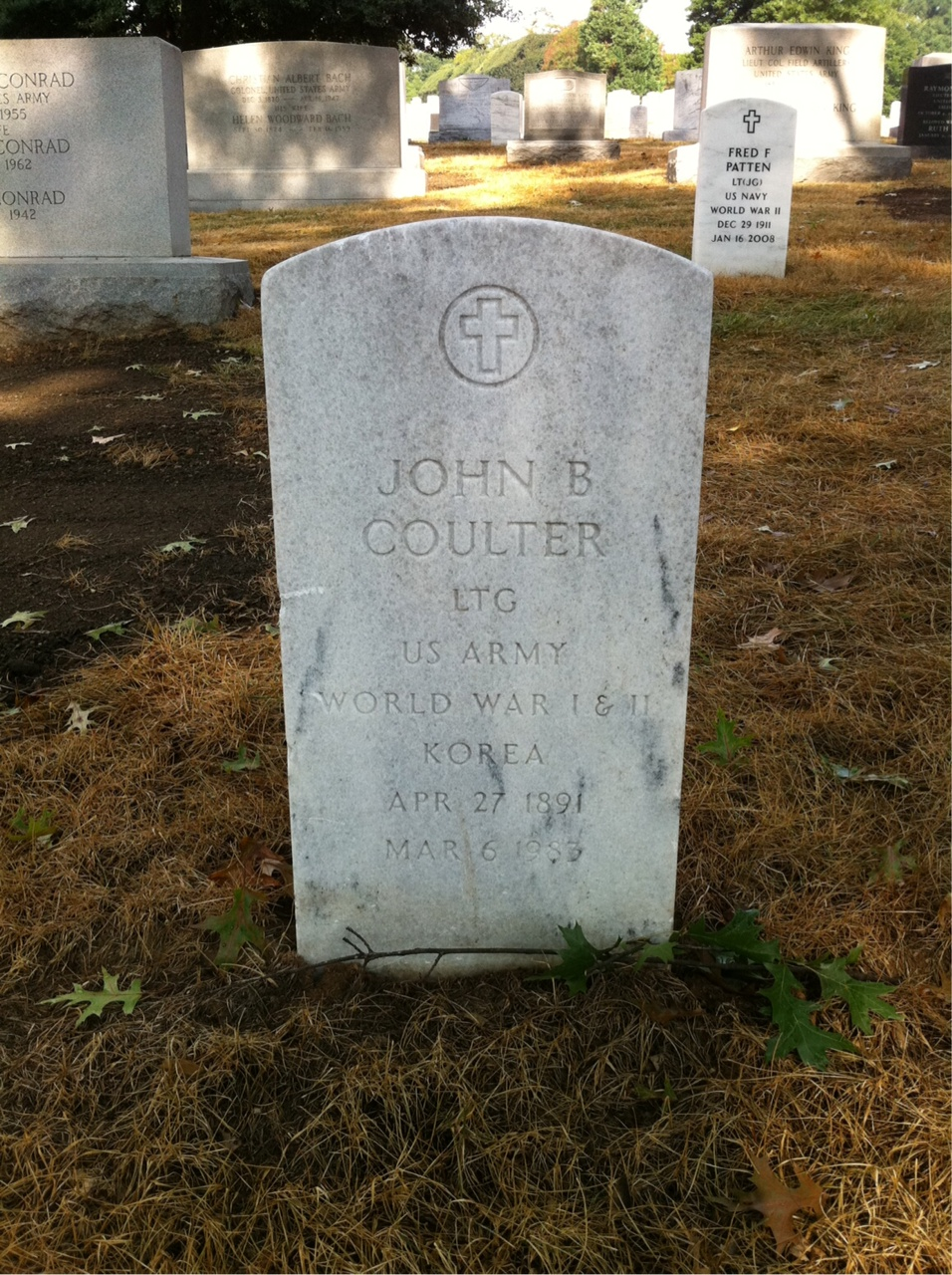
The grave of Lieutenant General John B. Coulter at Arlington National Cemetery.

Following his retirement, Coulter was appointed the Washington, D.C., representative of the United Nations Korean Reconstruction Agency (UNKRA), the organization formed to direct the international effort to rebuild South Korea after the Korean War. In 1953 he was named to head UNKRA, with the rank of UN Assistant Secretary-General, and he remained in this position until 1958. During his tenure, he directed the expenditure of more than $200 million for rebuilding South Korea's industry, schools, hospitals, roads and housing. During 1956 General Coulter also advised U.N. Secretary General Dag Hammarskjöld on peacekeeping forces during the Suez Crisis.

In 1959, Syngman Rhee, still the President of South Korea, erected a statue of Coulter to recognize his efforts to rebuild South Korea. The statue originally stood in the Itaewon District of Seoul. It was rededicated in 1977, and now stands at Seoul's San 18, Neung-dong, Kwangjin-gu.

In the 1960s, Coulter was President of the Korean Cultural and Freedom Foundation, an organization formed to recognize Korean War veterans and foster cultural exchanges between the U.S. and South Korea.

Coulter died in Washington, D.C., on March 6, 1983, and was buried at Arlington National Cemetery.

== Awards and decorations ==
His awards and decorations included the Army Distinguished Service Medal (3), Silver Star (2), Bronze Star, Distinguished Flying Cross, and Air Medal (6).

Citation for first Distinguished Service Medal:

June 18, 1944

As commanding general, 85th Infantry Division, from February 21, 1943, to June 5, 1944, he led his troops on a series of brilliant advances over a hundred miles of the most difficult terrain, climaxed by their entry into Rome on June 4, 1944. The outstanding accomplishments of this division in its first experience of combat, against a ruthless and battle-hardened enemy, were due primarily to his aggressive leadership. His continued emphasis on rigorous, intensive training, his indoctrination of his men with the proper mental conditioning for battle, and his comprehensive grasp of military tactics proved decisive factors in the grim fighting against the enemy-held strong points of Colle San Martino, Hill 121, Formia, Terracina and Mount Ceraso. By the diligent exercise of his gifts of leadership and constant presence at the front he made a signal contribution to the smashing defeat of the enemy's forces before Rome.

Citation for second Distinguished Service Medal: May 16, 1945

For exceptionally meritorious service in duty of great responsibility, from 17 August 1944 to 2 May 1945, in Italy. General Coulter commanded the 85th Division in its operations from the Cecina River to the Arno River and Gothic Line. Later, in the difficult cracking of this strongly held and prepared line the 85th Division, under the exceedingly brilliant direction of General Coulter, took Mount Altuzzo on 18 September after a 5-day battle. This was one of the most important tactical features of the Gothic Line, the capture of which greatly facilitated the further advance of the Fifth Army through the strongly defended German positions. Throughout winter action in the Apennines and during the victorious Allied offensive in the spring, Major General Coulter ably led his troops in the accomplishment of a vital role leading to the crushing defeat of the German forces in Italy. While preparing his division for its assignment in the offensive, he skillfully readjusted troop dispositions, consolidated and strengthened a vulnerable and important mountainous sector, and at the same time provided all possible facilities for the welfare of his troops then undergoing the hardships of mountain fighting in bitter weather. Having perfected plans for the offensive, Major General Coulter directed his division in a smashing attack, inspiring his men by his aggressive leadership and firm determination to press the attack rapidly and relentlessly. Advancing across the Po Valley, the 85th Division severed the vitally important Highway 9, crossed the Po River and continued its drive across the Adige Line, accomplishing an advance of more than one hundred miles in a period of ten days. The brilliant tactical skill and inspiring leadership of Major General Coulter resulted in an extremely vital contribution to the victory achieved by the 15th Army Group.

== Sources ==
- Blair, Clay (2003). The Forgotten War: America in Korea, 1950-1953 (illustrated, reprint ed.). Naval Institute Press. ISBN 1591140757.
- Blair, Clay (December 12, 1987). The forgotten war: America in Korea, 1950. Times Books. ISBN 0812916700.
- Military Memorial Museum, John Breitling Coulter biography, as of September, 1946, https://web.archive.org/web/20120301150115/http://www.militarymemorialmuseum.org/bio/Coulter_bio.pdf
- Texas Military Institute web site, John Breitling Coulter page, http://community.tmi-sa.org/NetCommunity/Page.aspx?pid=385
- The Story of the Rainbow Division, Raymond Sidney Tompkins, 1919, page 233
- U.S. Army Register, U.S. Army Adjutant General's Office, 1920, page 255
- U.S. Army List and Directory, published by U.S. Army Adjutant General's office, 1931, page 188
- 73 Officers Ordered to Army War College: Department Assigns Them From Several Branches for Course Starting in Fall, New York Times, January 26, 1932
- U.S. Army List and Directory, published by U.S. Army Adjutant General's Office, 1937, page 60
- Newspaper article, 2 Draft Divisions Made Italian Gains: First Selective-Service Units to Fight in Europe Are the 85th and the 88th Divisions, New York Times, May 29, 1944
- From Salerno to the Alps: a History of the Fifth Army, 1943–1945, Chester G. Starr, 1948, page 203
- Fort Meade and the Black Hills By Robert Lee, 1991, pages 217 to 218
- The Korean War: An Encyclopedia, Stanley Sandler, 1995, pages 93 to 94
- Alexander's Generals: the Italian Campaign, 1944–45, Gregory Blaxland, 1979
- The War North Of Rome: June 1944 - May 1945, Thomas R. Brooks, 2003
- Three Battles: Arnaville, Altuzzo, and Schmidt, Charles Brown MacDonald, 1952
- The Korean War: The Story and Photographs, Donald M. Goldstein and Harry J. Maihafer, 2001
- The Korean War: A Historical Dictionary, Paul M. Edwards, 2003, page 69
- Newspaper article, Maj. Gen. JB Coulter Named to 5th Army Post, Chicago Tribune, March 7, 1950
- Newspaper article, Maj. Gen. John B. Coulter Receives 22nd Decoration, El Paso Herald Post, October 10, 1950
- Newspaper article, Silver Star for Coulter, Stars and Stripes, October 12, 1950
- Newspaper article, Name Lt. Gen. Coulter Ridgway Aide to U. N., Chicago Daily Tribune, May 31, 1951
- Newspaper article, Gen. Coulter Returning to U.S., New York Times, June 30, 1951
- Newspaper article, Gen. Coulter Leaving Korea for New Post, Chicago Daily Tribune, August 11, 1951
- Newspaper article, Van Fleet Presents Gen. Coulter Cluster to DSM in Korea, Stars and Stripes, September 11, 1951
- How the United Nations Met the Challenge of Korea, U.N. Department of Public Information, 1953, page 15
- Newspaper article, Gen. Coulter Gets U.N. Korea Relief Post: Former 8th Army Aide Succeeds Kingsley, New York Times, May 13, 1953
- Facts on File Yearbook, 1953, Volume 12, page 77
- Current Biography Yearbook, H.W. Wilson Company, 1955, page 208
- Newspaper article, Statues For Generals, The Hartford Courant, June 26, 1958
- Korea Today, George M. McCune, 2007, page 231
- United Nations Memorial Cemetery – John B. Coulter statue UNMC Monuments
- Military Times, Hall of Heroes, Index of Recipients of Major Military Awards, https://web.archive.org/web/20180316020352/http://www.homeofheroes.com/verify/recipients_co.html

Military offices
Preceded by John Millikin	Commanding General 2nd Cavalry Division; May–July 1942	Succeeded by Harry H. Johnson
Preceded by Wade H. Haislip	Commanding General 85th Infantry Division; 1943–1945	Succeeded by Post deactivated
Preceded by Edwin William Piburn	Commanding General 7th Infantry Division; 1948–1949	Succeeded by Harlan N. Hartness
Preceded by Joseph May Swing	Commanding General I Corps; 1949–1950	Succeeded by William B. Kean
Preceded by William B. Kean	Commanding General I Corps; August–September 1950	Succeeded by Frank W. Milburn
Preceded by Frank W. Milburn	Commanding General IX Corps; 1950–1951	Succeeded by Bryant Moore
