= Orville Emil Bloch =

United States Army Medal of Honor recipient (1915–1983)

- Born: February 10, 1915; Big Falls, Wisconsin, US
- Died: May 28, 1983 (aged 68); Manson, Washington, US
- Burial place: Evergreen-Washelli Memorial Park, Seattle, Washington
- Military career
- Allegiance: United States
- Branch: United States Army
- Service years: 1942–1970
- Rank: Colonel
- Units: 338th Infantry Regiment, 85th Infantry Division
- Conflicts: World War II; Korean War
- Awards: Medal of Honor

Orville Emil Bloch (February 10, 1915 – May 28, 1983) was a United States Army officer and a recipient of the United States military's highest decoration—the Medal of Honor—for his actions in World War II.

== Biography ==
Bloch joined the Army from Streeter, North Dakota in February 1942, and by September 22, 1944 was serving as a first lieutenant in Company E, 338th Infantry Regiment, 85th Infantry Division. On that day, near Firenzuola, Italy, he led three soldiers in an attack on enemy positions which resulted in the capture of nineteen prisoners and the silencing of five machine gun nests. For these actions, he was awarded the Medal of Honor five months later, on February 10, 1945.

Bloch later served in the Korean War, and reached the rank of colonel before retiring in 1970. He died at age 68 and was buried in Evergreen-Washelli Memorial Park, Seattle, Washington.

== Medal of Honor citation ==
Bloch's official Medal of Honor citation reads:

For conspicuous gallantry and intrepidity at risk of life above and beyond the call of duty. 1st Lt. Bloch undertook the task of wiping out 5 enemy machinegun nests that had held up the advance in that particular sector for 1 day. Gathering 3 volunteers from his platoon, the patrol snaked their way to a big rock, behind which a group of 3 buildings and 5 machinegun nests were located. Leaving the 3 men behind the rock, he attacked the first machinegun nest alone charging into furious automatic fire, kicking over the machinegun, and capturing the machinegun crew of 5. Pulling the pin from a grenade, he held it ready in his hand and dashed into the face of withering automatic fire toward this second enemy machinegun nest located at the corner of an adjacent building 15 yards distant. When within 20 feet of the machinegun he hurled the grenade, wounding the machinegunner, the other 2 members of the crew fleeing into a door of the house. Calling one of his volunteer group to accompany him, they advanced to the opposite end of the house, there contacting a machinegun crew of 5 running toward this house. 1st Lt Bloch and his men opened fire on the enemy crew, forcing them to abandon this machinegun and ammunition and flee into the same house. Without a moment's hesitation, 1st Lt. Bloch, unassisted, rushed through the door into a hail of small-arms fire, firing his carbine from the hip, and captured the 7 occupants, wounding 3 of them. 1st Lt. Bloch with his men then proceeded to a third house where they discovered an abandoned enemy machinegun and detected another enemy machinegun nest at the next corner of the building. The crew of 6 spotted 1st Lt. Bloch the instant he saw them. Without a moment's hesitation he dashed toward them. The enemy fired pistols wildly in his direction and vanished through a door of the house, 1st Lt. Bloch following them through the door, firing his carbine from the hip, wounding 2 of the enemy and capturing 6. Altogether 1st Lt. Bloch had single-handedly captured 19 prisoners, wounding 6 of them and eliminating a total of 5 enemy machinegun nests. His gallant and heroic actions saved his company many casualties and permitted them to continue the attack with new inspiration and vigor.

== See also ==
- List of Medal of Honor recipients
- List of Medal of Honor recipients for World War II
