= 85th Support Command =

Infantry division of the U.S. Army in World War I and World War II

85th Division 85th Infantry Division 85th Support Command
- 85th Infantry Division shoulder sleeve insignia
- Active: 5 August 1917–18 April 1919 (National Army); 10 September 1921–25 August 1945 (Organized Reserves); 6 November 1946–1 June 1959 (Army Reserve); 1 June 1959–September 2007 (85th Training Div.); December 2008–present (8th Supt. Cmd.)
- Country: United States
- Allegiance: United States Army Reserve Command
- Branch: United States Army Reserve
- Type: Combat Support formerly Infantry
- Size: Command formerly Division
- Part of: First Army (United States)
- Garrison/HQ: Arlington Heights, Ill.
- Nickname: Custer (special designation)
- Engagements: World War I; World War II; Rome-Arno; North Apennines; Po Valley

Commanders
- Current commander: Brigadier General John Dunn
- Command Sergeant Major: CSM Jeremiah Kelly
- Notable commanders: BG Samuel W. Miller; MG Joseph T. Dickman; MG James Parker; MG Chase Wilmot Kennedy; MG Wade Haislip; MG John B. Coulter; MG Angelo M. Juarez; MG Wilbur J. Bunting; MG George M. Woywod; MG William Cockerham; MG George Hillard; MG William Allen; MG Michael Corrigan

Insignia
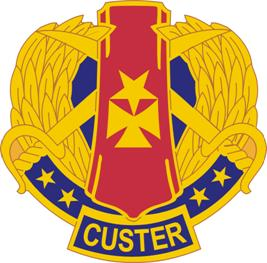
- Distinctive unit insignia

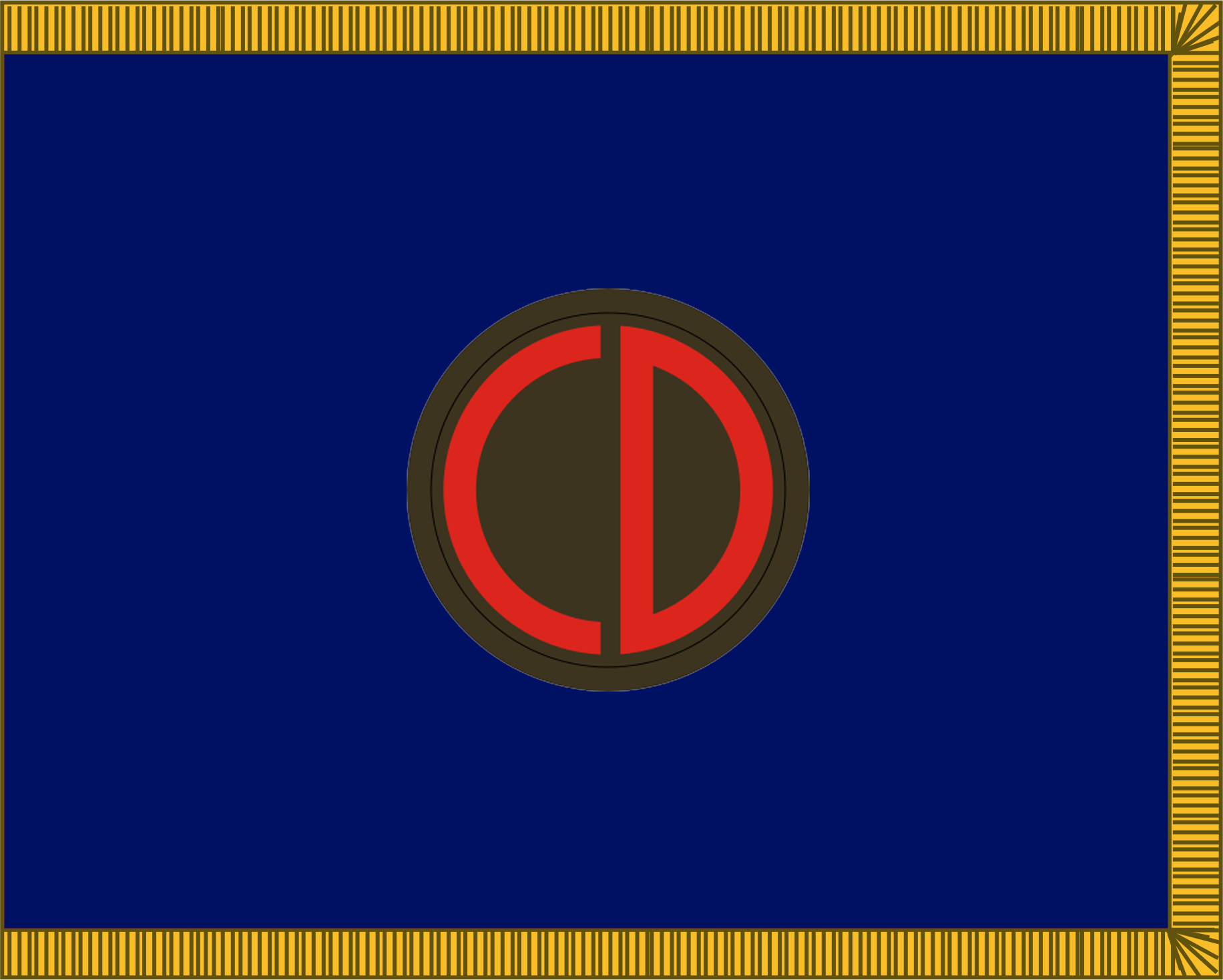
- 85th Support Command Flag

The 85th Infantry Division also known as the "Custer Division," was an infantry division of the United States Army in World War I and World War II. It currently exists as the 85th Support Command in the United States Army Reserve.

== History ==
=== World War I ===
The 85th Division was constituted by the War Department in August 1917 and directed to be formed at Camp Custer, Michigan, with Major General Joseph T. Dickman assuming command on 25 August. The officer cadre was provided from the Regular Army, Officers' Reserve Corps, and National Army officer graduates of the First Officers Training Camps. The enlisted personnel were initially draftees, mostly from Michigan but also some from Wisconsin. The division was nicknamed the "Custer Division" after its training camp, which itself was named for General George Armstrong Custer, who had commanded the "Michigan Brigade" of cavalry during the American Civil War. Training began in September, but in October, 2,000 men were transferred from the division. In November, a draft of 10,800 men arrived at Camp Custer and the division attained a strength of 20,000. However, between January and July 1918, over 50,000 men arrived at Camp Custer, but more than 30,000 left, many passing through the division. By 30 April 1918, the 85th Division had declined to a strength of less than 12,000, but in May, 7,600 men joined the division from Camp Custer's depot brigade. In June, fresh drafts, including 2,500 from Camp Grant, Illinois, and 1,500 from Camp Zachary Taylor, Kentucky, drawn largely from Illinois, Indiana, and Kentucky, completed the division. The 85th Division sailed for England in July and August 1918, before moving to France.

The Division was composed of the following units:

==== Order of battle ====
- Headquarters, 85th Division
- 169th Infantry Brigade
  - 337th Infantry Regiment
  - 338th Infantry Regiment
  - 329th Machine Gun Battalion
- 170th Infantry Brigade
  - 339th Infantry Regiment
  - 340th Infantry Regiment
  - 330th Machine Gun Battalion
- 160th Field Artillery Brigade
  - 328th Field Artillery Regiment (75 mm)
  - 329th Field Artillery Regiment (75 mm)
  - 330th Field Artillery Regiment (155 mm)
  - 310th Trench Mortar Battery
- 328th Machine Gun Battalion
- 310th Engineer Regiment
- 310th Field Signal Battalion
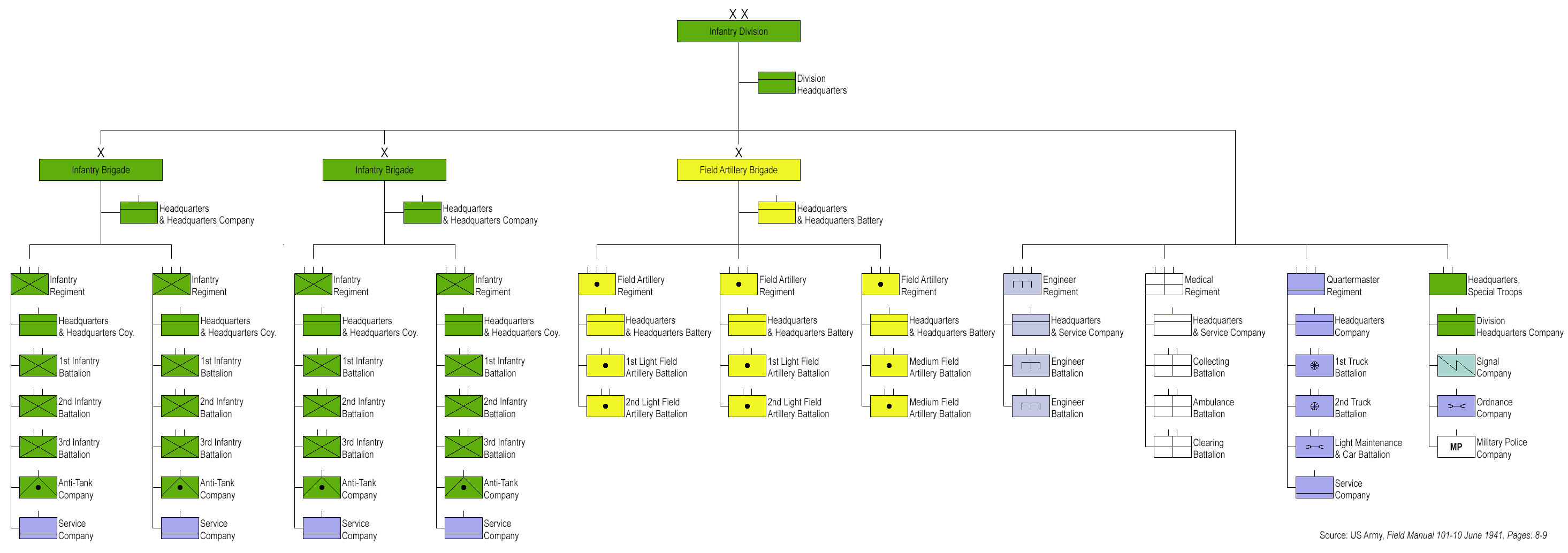
  Square Division example: 1940 US Infantry Division. On the far left can be seen two Brigades of two Regiments each
- Headquarters Troop, 85th Division
- 310th Train Headquarters and Military Police
  - 310th Ammunition Train
  - 310th Supply Train
  - 310th Engineer Train
  - 310th Sanitary Train
    - 337th-340th Ambulance Companies and Field Hospitals

From England, the 339th Infantry Regiment, 1st Battalion, 310th Engineers, and 337th Ambulance and Field Hospital Companies sailed to Arkhangelsk, in the former Russian Empire, as part of the Polar Bear Expedition to fight alongside the White Army against the Red Army in the Russian Civil War. When the remainder of the division arrived in France as part of the American Expeditionary Forces, it was reduced to cadre strength and designated the 4th Depot Division, being used to receive, equip, train, and forward casualty replacements and personnel returned from hospitals to frontline combat units. Men who passed through the division served in other divisions at the battles of St. Mihiel, Marbache, and in the Meuse-Argonne Offensive on the Western Front. After the war, the division remained on occupation duty in Germany and by April 1919, the last elements of the division returned to the United States.

=== Interwar period ===
The 85th Division headquarters arrived at the port of Hoboken, New Jersey, aboard the troopship RMS Aquitania on 29 March 1919 after 6 months of overseas service and was demobilized on 18 April at Camp Custer. Pursuant to the National Defense Act of 1920, the 85th Division was reconstituted in the Organized Reserve on 24 June 1921, allotted to the Sixth Corps Area, and assigned to the XVI Corps. The division was further allotted to Michigan as its home area. The division headquarters was organized on 10 September 1921 in Room 304 of the Old Customhouse Building in Detroit, relocated on 27 July 1922 to the Marquette Building, and moved again on 6 July 1923 to the New Telegraph Building. It was moved twice more before 1941; once to the Book Building at Washington and Grand River Avenues in 1926, and finally to the Federal Building in 1935, and remained there until activated for World War II. To maintain communications with the officers of the division, the division staff published a newsletter named “The 85th Division Bulletin.” The newsletter informed the division’s members of such things as when and where the inactive training sessions were to be held, what the division’s summer training quotas were, where the camps were to be held, and which units would help conduct the Citizens' Military Training Camps (CMTC).

The designated mobilization and training station for the division was Camp Custer, also where much of the division's peacetime training occurred in the interwar years. The division headquarters was called to active duty for training there as a unit on a number of occasions, the first time being in April 1926. Oddly, the division headquarters was ordered to active auty for a second time (5–19 July) that same summer. The headquarters attended summer training as a unit, other than for corps area and army-level command post exercises (CPXs), only twice more before World War II: once in the summer of 1928 and again in 1937. The headquarters and staff usually trained with the staff of the 12th Infantry Brigade, 6th Division, either at Camp Custer or at Fort Sheridan, Illinois. The infantry regiments of the division held their summer training primarily with the 2nd Infantry Regiment at Camp Custer beginning in June 1923, but also sometimes conducted joint summer training with the infantry regiments of the Michigan and Wisconsin National Guard's 32nd Division at the latter's respective training camps. Other units, such as the special troops, artillery, engineers, aviation, medical, and quartermaster trained at various posts in the Sixth and Seventh Corps Areas. For example, the division’s artillery trained with the 1st Battalion, 14th Field Artillery at Camp Custer; the special troops trained with the 32nd Division special troops at Camp Grayling, Michigan, or Camp Sparta (later McCoy), Wisconsin; the 310th Medical Regiment trained at Fort Snelling, Minnesota; and the 310th Observation Squadron trained with the 15th Observation Squadron at Chanute Field, Illinois. In addition to the unit training camps, the infantry regiments of the division rotated responsibility to conduct the CMTC held at Camp Custer each year.

On a number of occasions, the division participated in Sixth Corps Area or Second Army CPXs in conjunction with other Regular Army, National Guard, and Organized Reserve units. Unlike the Regular and Guard units in the Sixth Corps Area, the 85th Division did not participate in the various corps area maneuvers and the Second Army maneuvers of 1935, 1939, and 1940 as an organized unit due to lack of enlisted personnel and equipment. Instead, the officers and a few enlisted reservists were assigned to Regular and Guard units to fill vacant slots and bring the units up to war strength for the exercises. Additionally, some were assigned duties as umpires or support personnel.

=== World War II ===
==== Mobilization ====
Before Organized Reserve infantry divisions were ordered into active military service, they were reorganized on paper as "triangular" divisions under the 1940 tables of organization. The headquarters companies of the two infantry brigades were consolidated into the division's cavalry reconnaissance troop, and one infantry regiment was removed by inactivation. The field artillery brigade headquarters and headquarters battery became the headquarters and headquarters battery of the division artillery. Its three field artillery regiments were reorganized into four battalions; one battalion was taken from each of the two 75 mm gun regiments to form two 105 mm howitzer battalions, the brigade's ammunition train was reorganized as the third 105 mm howitzer battalion, and the 155 mm howitzer battalion was formed from the 155 mm howitzer regiment. The engineer, medical, and quartermaster regiments were reorganized into battalions. In 1942, divisional quartermaster battalions were split into ordnance light maintenance companies and quartermaster companies, and the division's headquarters and military police company, which had previously been a combined unit, was split.

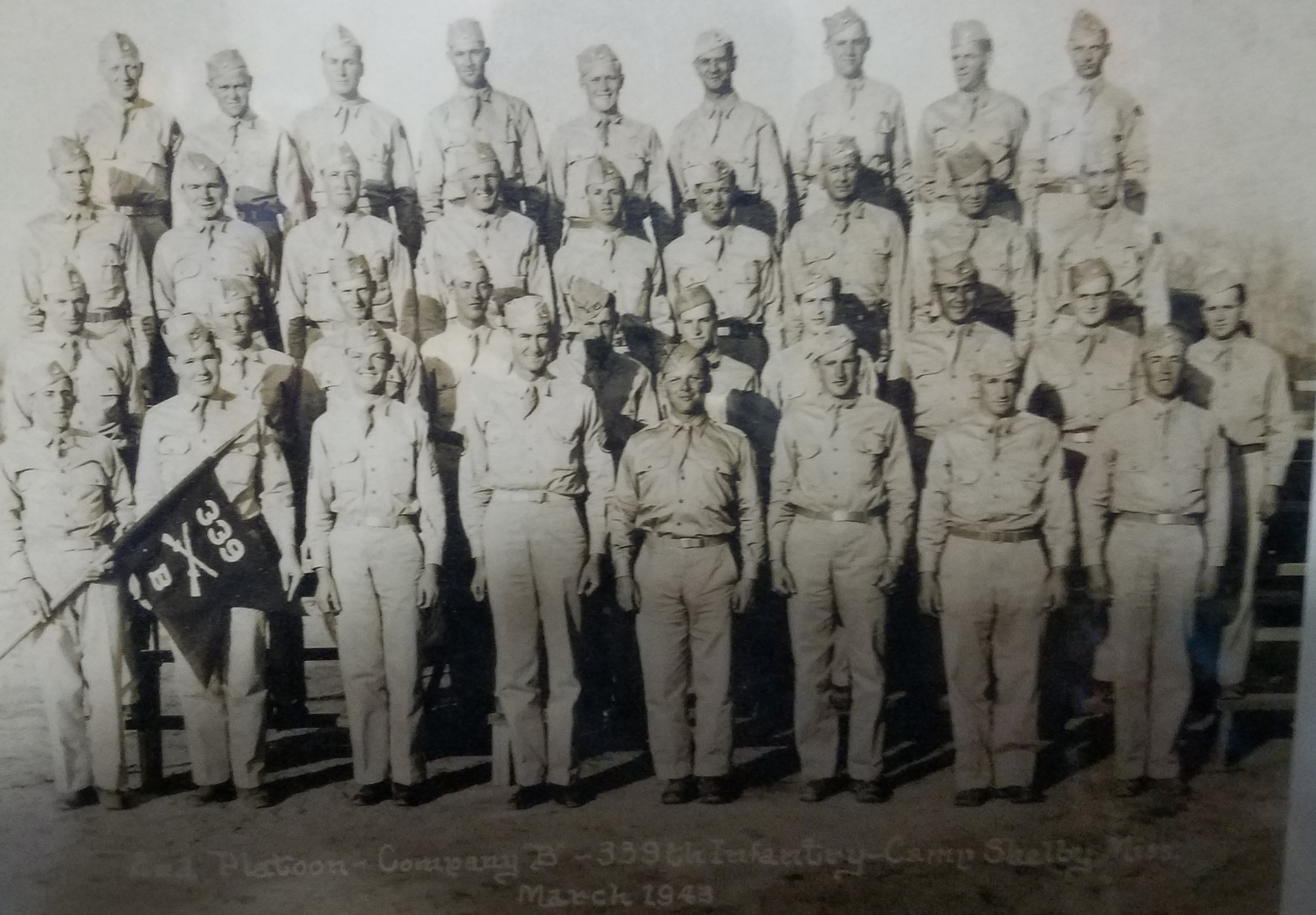
Men of the 2nd Platoon-Company B 339th Infantry Regiment at Camp Shelby, Mississippi in March 1943.

On 15 May 1942, five months after the United States entered World War II, the 85th Infantry Division was ordered to active duty at Camp Shelby, Mississippi, under the command of Major General Wade H. Haislip, a veteran of World War I. The division was organized around a cadre of officers and men from the 2nd Infantry Division, and training began in June 1942 at Camp Shelby. In April 1943, it participated in large-scale army training in the Louisiana Maneuvers near Leesville, Louisiana. In August, the division was moved to Camp Coxcomb, California for desert warfare training. In October, the division was transferred to Fort Dix, New Jersey, for final preparations before shipment overseas. Major General John B. Coulter succeeded Haislip as the 85th's commander and retained this position throughout the war. The Assistant Division Commander (ADC) throughout the war was Brigadier General Lee S. Gerow, the younger brother of General Leonard T. Gerow.

==== Division organization ====
The division consisted of the following units:

85th Infantry Division organization (click to enlarge)

- 85th Infantry Division
  - 85th Infantry Division Headquarters
  - 85th Cavalry Reconnaissance Troop (Mechanized) (M3 scout cars and then M8 Greyhound armored cars)
  - 337th Infantry Regiment
    - Headquarters and Headquarters Company
    - 3× Infantry battalions
      - each battalion consists of: 1× Headquarters and Headquarters Company, 3× Rifle companies, 1× Heavy Weapons Company
    - Cannon Company (T12 Gun Motor Carriages and T19 Howitzer Motor Carriages, later replaced by either M3 105mm towed howitzers or M7 Priest self propelled howitzers)
    - Anti-Tank Company (M3 37mm anti-tank guns, which were replaced by 1944 with M1 57mm anti-tank guns)
    - Service Company
  - 338th Infantry Regiment
    - same organization as 337th Infantry Regiment
  - 339th Infantry Regiment
    - same organization as 337th Infantry Regiment
  - 85th Infantry Division Artillery
    - Headquarters and Headquarters Battery
    - 328th Field Artillery Battalion
      - Headquarters and Headquarters Battery
      - 3× Batteries (M2 105mm towed howitzers)
      - Service Battery
    - 329th Field Artillery Battalion
      - same organization as 328th Field Artillery Battalion
    - 403rd Field Artillery Battalion
      - Headquarters and Headquarters Battery
      - 3× Batteries (M1 155mm towed howitzers)
      - Service Battery
    - 910th Field Artillery Battalion
      - same organization as 328th Field Artillery Battalion
  - Headquarters Special Troops
    - Headquarters Company, 85th Infantry Division
    - 85th Signal Company
    - 85th Quartermaster Company
    - 785th Ordnance Light Maintenance Company
    - Military Police Platoon
    - 85th Infantry Division Band (attached)
  - 310th Engineer Combat Battalion
    - Headquarters and Headquarters and Service Company
    - 3× Engineer combat companies
  - 310th Medical Battalion
    - Headquarters and Headquarters Detachment
    - 3× Collecting companies
    - Clearing Company

==== Combat chronicle ====
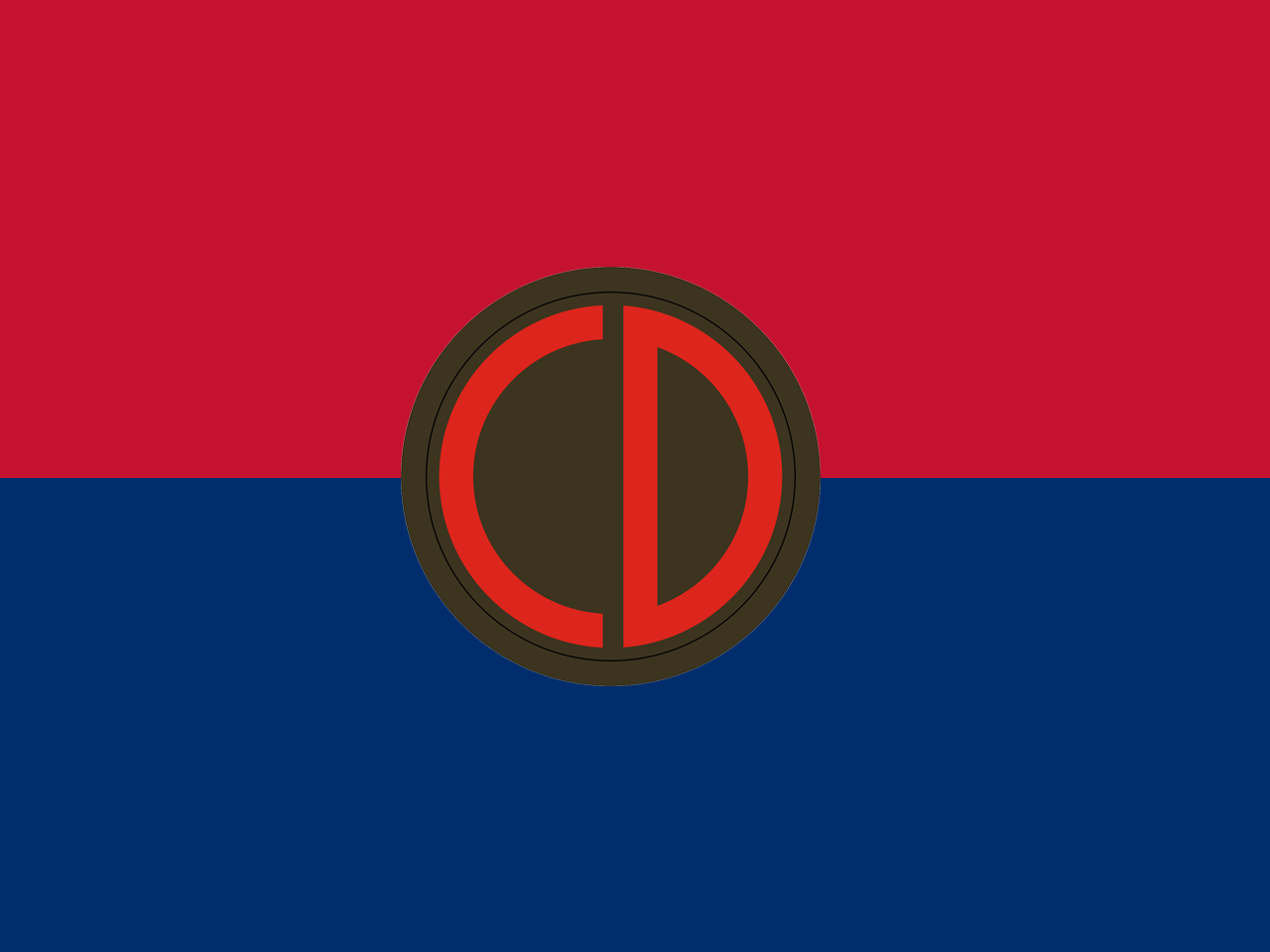
File:Flag of the United States Army 85th Infantry Division

The 85th Infantry Division left the United States on 24 December 1943 and arrived in Casablanca, French Morocco on 2 January 1944. It received amphibious training at Port aux Poules near Arzew and Oran, Algeria, 1 February to 23 March, then embarked for Naples, Italy, arriving on 27 March. The 339th Regimental Combat Team was the first division element to depart Port-Aux-Poules for movement to the Italian Campaign. Arriving in Italy on 14 March, the 339th RCT was attached to the 88th Infantry Division and became the first regiment of the 85th to see combat during World War II on the Minturno-Castelforte front north of Naples, 28 March. The 85th and 88th Infantry Divisions were the first two United States Army divisions composed nearly entirely of draftees (i.e., Organized Reserve or Army of the United States divisions) to see combat during World War II. The 85th Division, under II Corps of the U.S. Fifth Army under Mark W. Clark, was committed to action as a unit, 10 April 1944, north of the Garigliano River, facing the Gustav Line, and held defensive positions for a month.

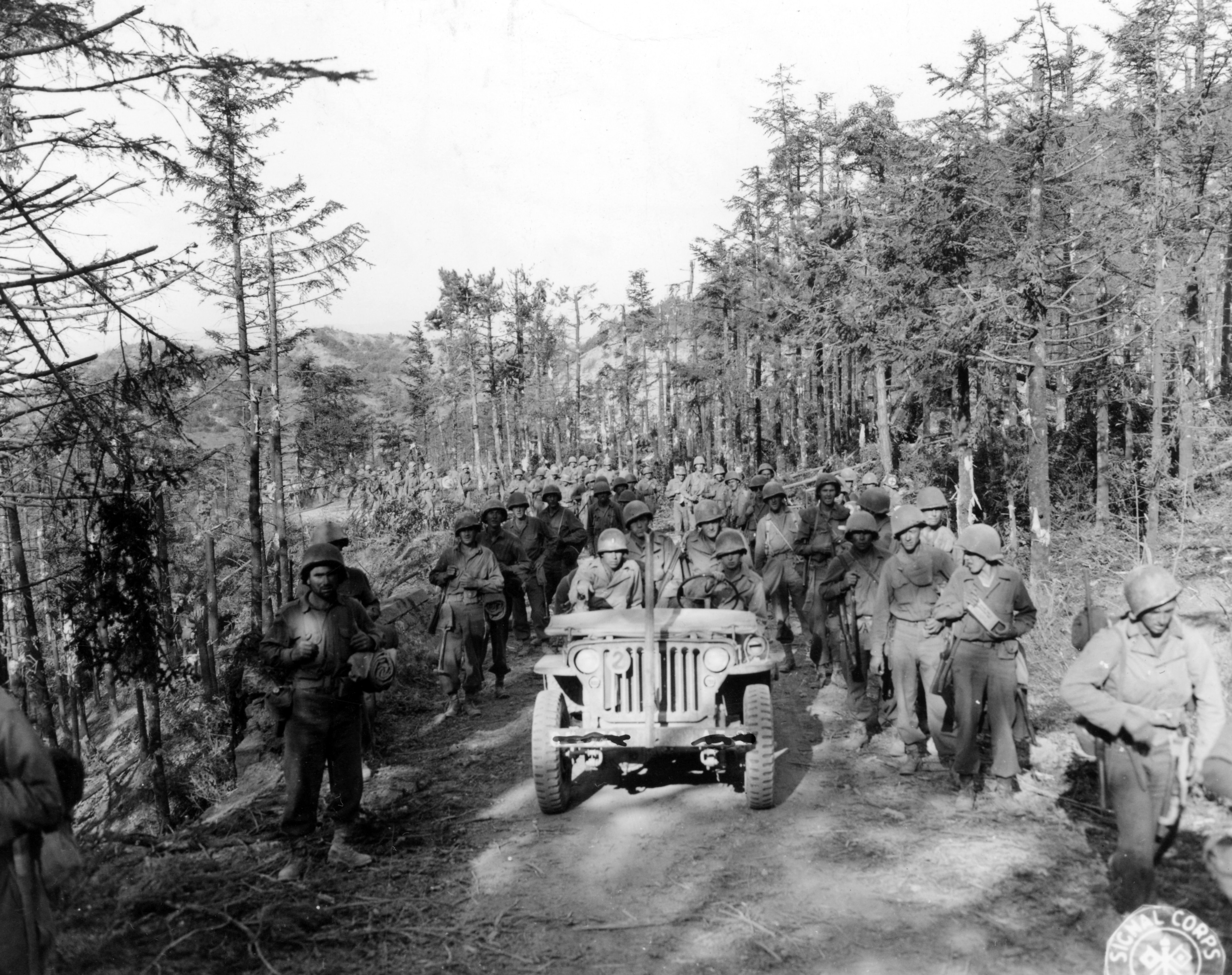
Troops of the 338th Infantry Regiment, 85th Division, marching toward newly-won position in the Gothic Line. 19 September, 1944.

On 11 May, it launched its attack, taking Solacciano, Castellonorato, and Formia. Itri fell, 19 May, and the 85th continued to mop up the Gaeta Peninsula. Terracina was taken and the road to the Anzio beachhead was opened. The division pursued the enemy to the hills near Sezze until pinched out by friendly forces from Anzio. The Gustav Line had been smashed and the 85th started for a rest area on 29 May, but was ordered to the Lariano sector which the division cleared by the 31st. Driving on Rome, the 85th pushed through Monte Compatri and Frascati, entered the Italian capital of Rome on 5 June 1944, and advanced to Viterbo before being relieved on 10 June.

After rehabilitation and training, the 85th took over the defense of the Arno River line from 15 to 26 August. The division attacked the mountain defenses of the Gothic Line on 13 September, and broke through, taking Firenzuola on the 21st. The 85th advanced slowly through mud and rain against heavy resistance taking La Martina and gaining the Idice River Valley road on 2 October, and reaching Mount Mezzano on the 24th overlooking the Po River Valley. From 27 October to 22 November 1944, defense areas near Pizzano were held. On the 23d, the division was relieved for rest and rehabilitation.

The 85th Division relieved the British 1st Infantry Division on 6 January 1945, and limited its activities to cautious patrols until 13 March. After a brief training period, the 85th, now under the command of Major General Willis D. Crittenberger's IV Corps, during the final offensive in Italy, thrust southwest of Bologna on 14 April, pushing through Lucca and Pistoia into the Po Valley as enemy resistance collapsed. The Panaro River was crossed on the 23rd and the Po the next day. The division mopped up fleeing Germans until their mass surrender on 2 May 1945, in the Belluno-Agordo area. The end of World War II in Europe came six days later. Four soldiers of the Division (First lieutenant Orville Emil Bloch, Sergeant Chris Carr (born Christos H. Karaberis), Staff sergeant George Dennis Keathley, and First Lieutenant Robert T. Waugh) were awarded the Medal of Honor (the last two posthumously).

==== Casualties ====
- Total battle casualties: 8,774
- Killed in action: 1,561
- Wounded in action: 6,314
- Missing in action: 402
- Prisoner of war: 497

=== Cold War ===
The division returned to the United States and was disbanded at Camp Patrick Henry, Virginia on 26 August 1945. It was then reconstituted and reactivated at Chicago, Illinois on 19 February 1947 in the United States Army Reserve. On 1 June 1959, the division's mission was changed to training and it was named the 85th Division (Training).

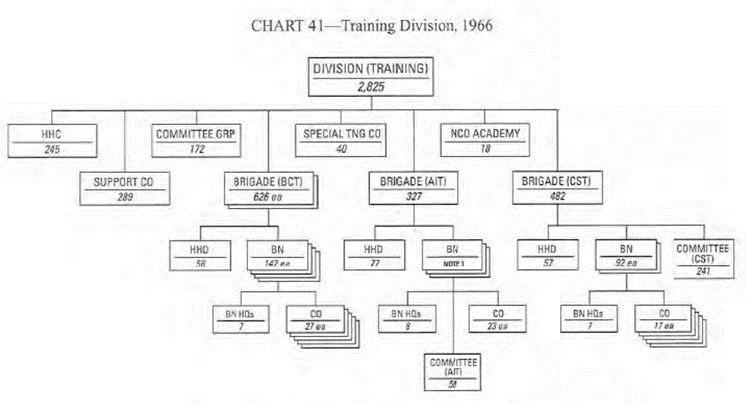
Standard organization chart for a training division

==== Cold War organization ====
Upon reactivation in the Army Reserve, the division was organized with a division headquarters, three training brigades and a training group, with division headquarters located in Chicago, Illinois. In 1983, the Division Headquarters was moved to Arlington Heights, Illinois, with subordinate brigade headquarters located in Waukegan, Illinois (1st Brigade); St. Louis, Missouri (2nd Brigade); Rockford, Illinois (3rd Brigade); Fort Sheridan, Illinois (4th Brigade); and Aurora, Illinois (Training Group).

In 1992, the division was reorganized into the 85th Division (Exercise) with the mission of conducting lanes training for combat, combat support, and combat service support units and combat simulation, computer supported exercises for company/battalion and higher units for Army Reserve and Army National Guard units in the First Army area. Additionally, the division was tasked to assist First Army units at mobilization to validate their readiness for deployment. The division was reorganized as follows:

- 85th Division (Exercise) HQ, Arlington Heights, Illinois
- 85th Division (Exercise) Band, Fort Sheridan, Illinois
- 1st Brigade (Battle Command Staff Training), Fort Sheridan, Illinois
- 2nd Brigade (Field Exercise), Fort McCoy, Wisconsin
- 3rd Brigade (Field Exercise), Selfridge ANGB, Michigan
- 4th Brigade (Field Exercise), Fort Sheridan, Illinois
- 5th Brigade (Field Exercise), Fort Snelling, Minnesota
- 6th Brigade (Field Exercise), Fort Benjamin Harrison, Indiana

In 1999 the division was further reorganized as the 85th Division (Training Support). Its four brigades were headquartered as follows:

- 1st Brigade (Training Support (TS)): 1st Simulations Exercise (SIMEX) Group; 2nd SIMEX Group; and 3rd Battalion (TS), 335th Regiment at Fort Sheridan, Illinois
- 2nd Brigade (TS): 3rd Battalion (TS), 335th Regiment, 1st Battalion (TS), 338th Regiment; 1st Battalion (TS), 340th Regiment, 3rd Battalion (TS), 340th Regiment, 2nd Battalion, 411th Regiment (Logistics Support) at Fort McCoy, Wisconsin
- 3rd Brigade (TS): 1st Battalion (TS) and 2nd Battalion (TS), 335th Regiment; 2nd Battalion (TS), 338th Regiment; 3rd Battalion, 411th Regiment (Logistics Support) at Indianapolis, IN
- 4th Brigade (TS): 1st Battalion (TS) and 3rd Battalion (TS), 337th Regiment; 1st Battalion (TS), 409th Regiment; 1st Battalion (TS), 2nd Battalion (TS), and 3rd Battalion (TS) 410th Regiment; 1st Battalion, 411th Regiment (Logistics Support) at Fort Knox, KY.

== Present ==
=== Unit inactivation and reactivation ===
In September 2007, the 85th Division (Training Support) was formally inactivated and its remaining assets folded into the 75th Division (Training Support) and the 88th Regional Readiness Command. In December 2008, the 85th Division was reactivated as the 85th Support Command to provide training and logistical support to First Army.

=== Organization ===
The 85th Support Command is a subordinate functional command of the United States Army Reserve Command and tasked with training Army Reserve and Army National Guard units preparing for deployment. The command's ten brigades field a mix of active and reserve units. As of January 2026, the command consists of the following units:

- 85th Support Command, in Arlington Heights (IL)
  - 4th Cavalry Brigade, at Fort Knox (KY)
  - 5th Armored Brigade, at Fort Bliss (TX)
  - 120th Infantry Brigade, at Fort Hood (TX)
  - 157th Infantry Brigade, at Camp Atterbury (IN)
  - 166th Aviation Brigade, at Fort Hood (TX)
  - 174th Infantry Brigade, at Joint Base McGuire–Dix–Lakehurst (NJ)
  - 177th Armored Brigade, at Camp Shelby (MS)
  - 181st Infantry Brigade, at Fort McCoy (WI)
  - 188th Infantry Brigade, at Fort Stewart (GA)
  - 189th Infantry Brigade, at Joint Base Lewis–McChord (WA)

== Unit officers ==
Commanders within the division who became U.S. Army general officers include:

- MG Emile Bataille who commanded the 2nd Simulation Group, 1st Brigade, and then as an Army National Guard Brigadier General was the Assistant Adjutant General of Illinois and then served as the J6, United States Strategic Command
- MG Steve Best, who commanded the 1st Simulation Group, 1st Brigade and then commanded the 1st Brigade, and later commanded the 75th Division in Houston, TX
- MG William D. Razz Waff, who commanded the 2nd Simulation Group, 1st Brigade, and then served as the Chief of Staff, 88th Regional Readiness Command, Ft Snelling, MN, the Deputy Commanding General, 99th Regional Readiness Command, Pittsburgh, PA, was the Deputy Commanding General, US Army Human Resources Command, Alexandria, VA, the Commanding General, 99th Regional Support Command, Ft Dix, NJ and then as the Deputy G-1, Headquarters, US Army, The Pentagon
- MG James Parker, a Medal of Honor recipient who commanded the division from December 1917 to February 1918.
- BG Ward Arnston, commander, 1st Simulation Group, then as the CG, 1st Brigade, 85th Division, then as the Deputy Commanding General, 75th Division, Houston, TX;
- BG John Hanley, commander, 1st Simulation Group, 1st Brigade, then as the Deputy Commanding General, 88th Regional Support Command, Ft McCoy, WI;
- BG Ronald S. Mangum, who commanded the 1st and 4th Brigades, the Battle Projection Group, and the 1st Battalion, 340th Infantry (INST).

== Heraldry ==
- Nickname: Custer Division
- Shoulder Sleeve Insignia: The shoulder sleeve insignia was originally approved for the 85th Division on 24 December 1918. It was cancelled and a new design approved for the 85th Division (Training) on 29 June 1970 (Pentagon inside octagon). On 24 February 1986, the original shoulder sleeve insignia, (large red "CD" initials) was reinstated for the 85th Division (Training). The insignia was redesignated for the 85th Division (Training Support) effective 17 October 1999. It was redesignated for the 85th U.S. Army Reserve Support Command on 4 November 2008. (TIOH Drawing Number A-1-540)

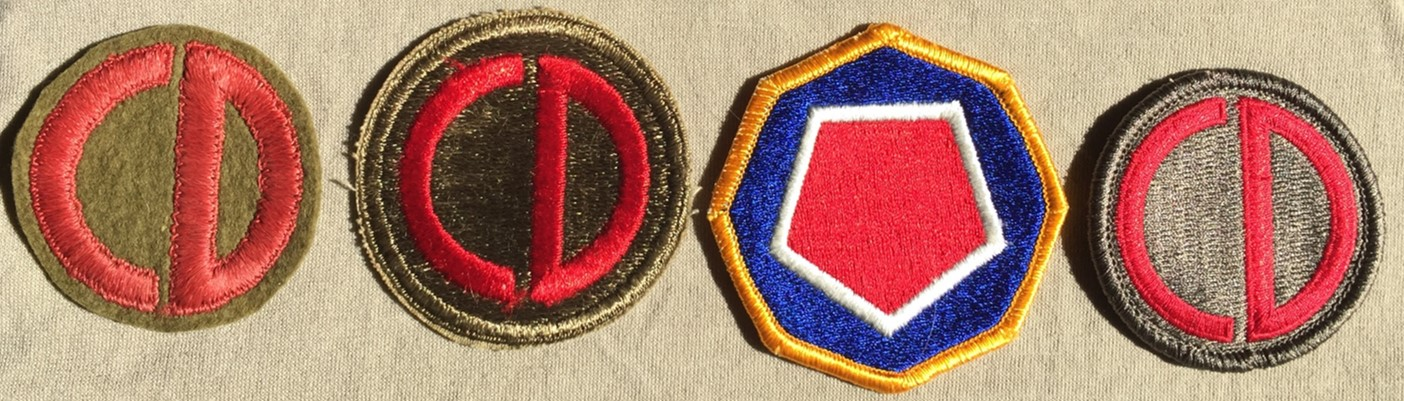
Shoulder Sleeve Insignia authorized for the 85th Infantry Division. World War I, World War II, 1970–1986, Present

- Distinctive Unit Insignia: General George Custer is represented by the colors scarlet and blue used on his personal flag, and by the scarlet cravat bearing the device of the Michigan Cavalry Brigade, which often formed a part of his uniform. His distinguished service in the Cavalry is recalled by the crossed sabres, and laurel wreath refers to his many victories and achievements in the service of his country. The blue scroll with two stars on either refer to the rank of major general which Custer attained during the Civil War, becoming the Army's youngest general.

== Campaign streamers ==
Conflict	Streamer	Year(s)
World War I	No Inscription	
World War II	Rome-Arno	1944
World War II	North Apennines	1944-1945
World War II	Po Valley	1945

== Decorations ==
Ribbon	Award	Year	Orders
	Army Superior Unit Award	2008-2011	Permanent Orders 332-07 announcing award of the Army Superior Unit award

== Bibliography ==
- Army Publication: "Minturno to the Apennines", booklet published by MTOUSA and issued to troops in 1945.
- House, John M. Wolfhounds and Polar Bears: The American Expeditionary Force in Siberia, 1918-1920. Tuscaloosa: University of Alabama Press, 2016. ISBN 9780817359492 OCLC 927241483
- Nelson, James Carl. The Polar Bear Expedition: The Heroes of America's Forgotten Invasion of Russia, 1918-1919. First ed. New York, NY: William Morrow, an imprint of HarperCollins, 2019. ISBN 9780062852779 OCLC 1041763187
- Unit History: Schultz, Paul; History of the 85th Infantry Division in World War II. Battery Press, 1979. ISBN 0898390192 OCLC 5003605
