= William D. Razz Waff =

United States Army general

Major General William D. Razz Waff
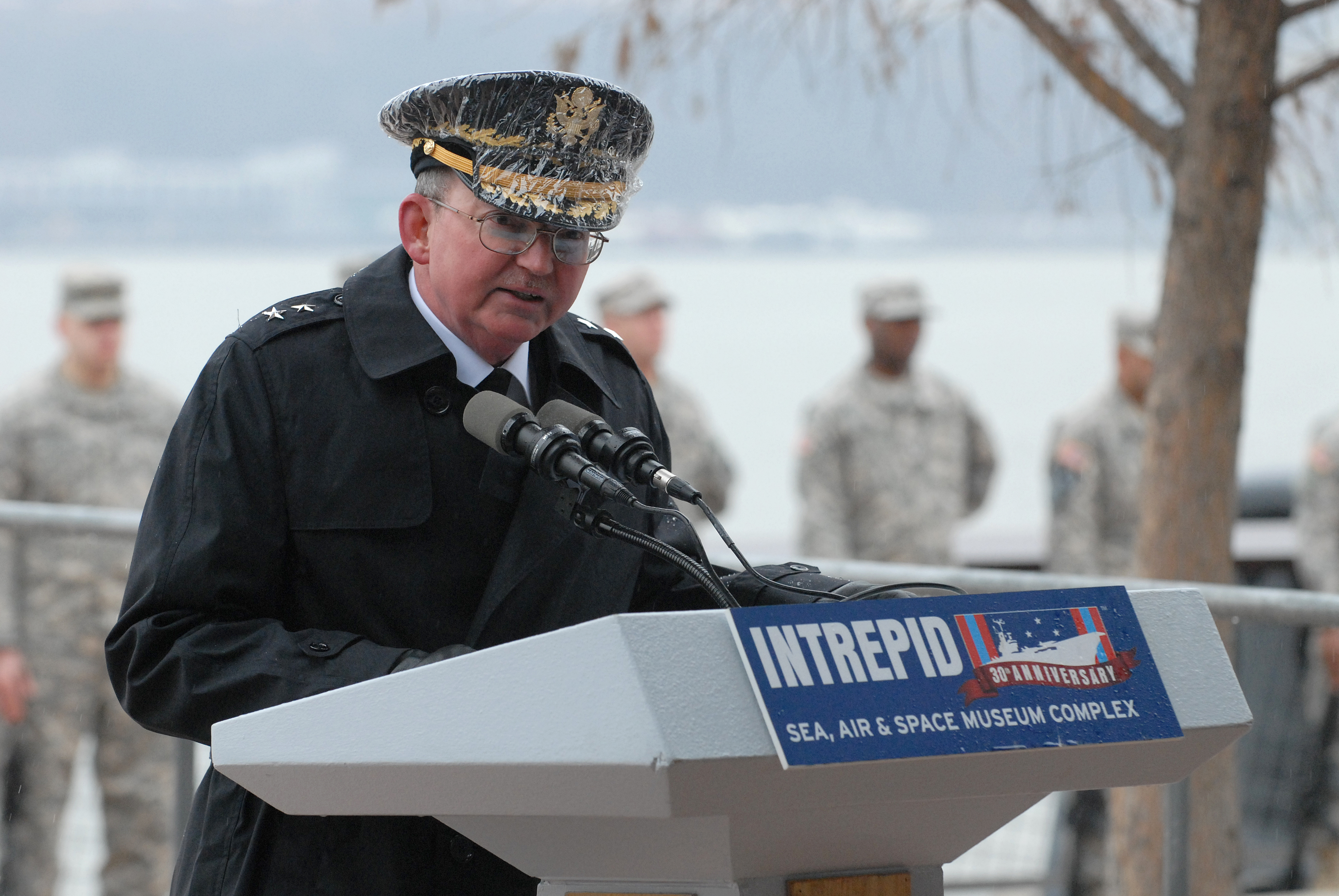
- Waff addresses guests during the Pearl Harbor Day ceremony on the Intrepid Sea on December 7, 2012.
- Military career
- Allegiance: American
- Branch: U.S. Army, U.S. Army Reserve
- Service years: Over 39
- Rank: Major General
- Units: 85th Division, 88th Regional Readiness Command, 99th Regional Readiness Command, US Army Human Resources Command, 99th Regional Support Command
- Commands: 1485th Logistics Support Battalion, 2nd Group, 1st Brigade, 85th Division, 99th Regional Support Command
- Awards: Distinguished Service Medal with One Oak Leaf Cluster, Legion of Merit with one Oak Leaf Cluster, the Meritorious Service Medal with four Oak Leaf Clusters, the Joint Service Commendation Medal, the Army Commendation Medal with three Oak Leaf Clusters, the Army Achievement Medal with one Oak Leaf Cluster, the Armed Forces Reserve Medal with the Gold Hourglass Device, the National Defense Service Medal with Bronze Service Star, the Humanitarian Service Medal, the Military Outstanding Volunteer Service Medal, the Army Reserve Component Achievement Medal with seven Oak Leaf Clusters and the Army Service Ribbon. Additionally he has received the Horatio Gates Gold Medal and the Theodore Roosevelt Medal from the Adjutant General's Corps Regimental Association.

Major General William D. Razz Waff was the United States Department of the Army Deputy GI (Personnel) in Washington, D.C., as of 2013, and chairman, Army Reserve Forces Policy Committee (ARFPC) since January 2014, retiring on 30 September 2015 after over 39 years of service. Previously he served as the commanding general of the Army Reserve's 99th Regional Support Command from 2010 till 2013. and also as the senior commander, Ft Devens, Massachusetts, and Ft Dix, New Jersey, while serving as the commanding general, 99th RSC.

== Education ==
Waff attended the Virginia Military Institute and the University of Mississippi. He earned his Bachelor of Music degree, graduating in 1976, magna cum laude. Waff was appointed as a Distinguished Military Graduate in the Regular Army as a Second Lieutenant in the Adjutant General's Corps through the Ole Miss Reserve Officer Training Corps.

In 1983, he received a Master in Divinity degree from Seabury-Western Theological Seminary in Evanston, Illinois, and was then ordained as a deacon on 12 June 1983 at Christ Church, Greeneville, South Carolina,. and then ordained as a priest on 9 May 1984 at Trinity Cathedral in Columbia, D.C. . In 1997, Waff earned his doctorate in medical ethics through the Graduate Theological Foundation and Georgetown University. In 2001, he received a Master of Strategic Studies degree from the US Army War College, Carlisle, Pennsylvania, and in 2015 received an honorary Master of Military Arts and Science degree from the US Army Command and General Staff College, Ft. Leavenworth, Kansas.

== Career ==
Waff has held numerous positions of increasing responsibility throughout his military career and received various recognitions for his service, both in the army and in his personal life.

He served in active duty for four years at Fort Jackson, South Carolina, and held a variety of positions including, the Executive Officer of the Advanced Individual Training Company; Battalion Adjutant for the 11th Battalion; executive officer and commander for the Fort Jackson Headquarters Company; and the executive officer and adjutant for the Military Enlistment Processing Station.

Waff joined the United States Army Reserve in October 1980. Among his many titles, Waff also served as executive officer of the 479th Personnel Service Company at Fort Sheridan, Illinois, and chief, Strength Management Office, of the 85th Maneuver Exercise Command (MEC) from 1989 to 1992.

Between 1992 and 2000, Waff was assigned other positions, including commander of the 1485th Logistics Support Battalion and director of the Simulations Branch (Battle Projection Group, 1st Brigade, 85th Division). In June 2002, he was chosen for the position of chief of staff of the 88th Regional Readiness Command. Waff remained in this role till 2005.

In that same year, he was promoted to brigadier general, and served as the deputy commanding general of the 99th Regional Readiness Command. For this particular position, Waff was responsible for "administrative, logistics, and facilities support to more than 51,000 Army Reserve soldiers, 160,000 family members in 439 units at 328 Army Reserve centers, and 33 maintenance facilities in Virginia, Maryland, Delaware, Pennsylvania, New York, New Jersey, New Hampshire, Massachusetts, Connecticut, Maine, Vermont, Rhode Island, and Washington, D.C." On 9 May 2016 the 99th Regional Support Command and Army Support Activity Fort Dix were awarded the Army Superior Unit Award (ASUA) by the US Army Human Resource Command on 9 May 2016 for their role in relief efforts after Hurricane Sandy. This was the first time an Army Reserve unit was awarded the ASUA for a role in a Defense Support to Civil Authority (DSCA) mission.

On 22 December 2010, he was promoted to major general.

Since retiring, Waff was selected as the executive director of the Military Chaplains Association (www.mca-usa.org), beginning in February 2018. The Military Chaplains Association is the professional association of over 3,000 US military, Civil Air Patrol and federal chaplains, for which it provides advocacy, communication and education. Additionally, Waff was reappointed to the US Army Command and General Staff College Board of Visitors for a second three-year term, has continued to serve on the Army Reserve Advisory Group for the US Merchant Marine Academy at King's Point, New York, and is the senior mentor for the Professor of Military Science at the University of Memphis. In July, 2018, he was appointed to the board of directors of Omicron Delta Kappa, the national leadership society, for a two-year term.

Outside of the army, Waff was ordained as a priest at Trinity Cathedral in the Diocese of Upper South Carolina in 1984 and has served as the director of pastoral care and ethics of St. Luke's Episcopal Hospital, Racine, Wisconsin, and as director of pastoral care, ethics, and interpreter services at Vista Health in Waukegan, Illinois. He also served as the president of the Wisconsin Chaplaincy Commission, national chairman of the Joint Commission on the Accreditation of Pastoral Services and as the chairman, standards committee, Association of Professional Chaplains (APC). He is also a Board Certified Chaplain of APC. He is also a member of the Sovereign Military Order of the Temple of Jerusalem (SMOTJ) with the rank of Grand Officer of the Temple of Jerusalem (GOTJ), the Hospitallar and Military Order of St. Lazarus of Jerusalem with the rank of Ecclesiastical Grand Cross of St. Lazarus (EGCLJ), and as a member of The Noble Company of St Mary of Walsingham.

== Awards ==
Waff has received many awards, including, the Distinguished Service Medal with one Oak Leaf Cluster, Legion of Merit with one Oak Leaf Cluster, the Meritorious Service Medal with four Oak Leaf Clusters, the Army Achievement Medal with one Oak Leaf Cluster, and the National Defense Service Medal with Bronze Service Star, The Humanitarian Service Medal and the Army Superior Unit Award for the 99th Regional Support Command's relief efforts after Hurricane Sandy, The Military Outstanding Volunteer Service Medal and the Adjutant General's Corp Regimental Association's Horatio Gates Gold Medal. Growing up in Memphis, he earned the Eagle Scout Award in 1967 as a member of Troop 66 of St. Michael's Roman Catholic Church in Memphis, and was also inducted into the Order of the Arrow.. He was awarded the Distinguished Eagle Scout Award on July 10, 2020, which was presented to him in his home Chickasaw Council (Memphis) at the annual Eagle Scout Dinner on March 31, 2022.
