= Lee S. Gerow =

United States Army general (1891–1982)

Lee Saunders Gerow
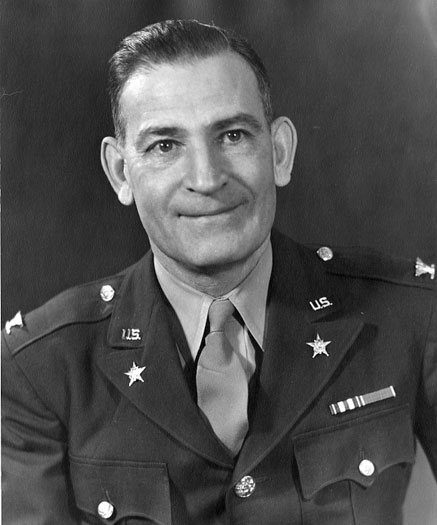
- Born: March 29, 1891; Petersburg, Virginia, US
- Died: May 19, 1982 (aged 91); Washington, D.C., US
- Burial place: Arlington National Cemetery
- Relatives: Leonard T. Gerow (brother)
- Military career
- Branch: United States Army
- Service years: 1916–1949
- Rank: Brigadier general
- Service number: O4681
- Unit: Infantry Branch
- Commands: 338th Infantry Regiment
- Conflicts: Mexican Border War; World War I; World War II; Italian campaign; Rome–Arno campaign; North Apennines campaign; Po Valley campaign
- Awards: Silver Star; Legion of Merit; Bronze Star (2); Commendation Ribbon (2); Croix de guerre 1939-1945 (France)

Lee Saunders Gerow (March 29, 1891 – May 19, 1982) was a decorated brigadier general in the United States Army who served in World War I and World War II. He was the younger brother of Leonard T. Gerow. During World War II, he was the assistant division commander of the 85th Infantry Division from 1943 to 1945, serving with it in the Italian campaign.

== Early military years ==
Lee Saunders Gerow was born in Petersburg, Virginia, on March 29, 1891, the son of Leonard Rogers Gerow, a railroad conductor, and Annie Eloise Saunders. He had three brothers, including Leonard Townsend Gerow, and a sister. He attended the Virginia Military Institute and graduated in 1913 with a Bachelor of Science degree in civil engineering. Like his older brother Leonard in 1911, Gerow was class valedictorian.

Despite his class standing, Gerow failed to secure an appointment in the Regular Army, and went to work for an engineering firm in Florida. He then received an offer of a teaching position at the Columbia Military Academy in Columbia, Tennessee. While there he met his future wife, Margaret. When Congress created an additional 200 officer positions in the Regular Army, Gerow passed the qualifying examination and was commissioned as a second lieutenant in the Infantry Branch on November 30, 1916. He was assigned to the 36th Infantry and served on the Mexican border during the Pancho Villa Expedition. After the crisis passed, he was transferred to Fort Snelling, Minnesota, where he was appointed a company commander and promoted to first lieutenant, backdated to the November 30, 1916. He was promoted to the rank of captain the next year, and then to major.

== Interwar service ==
In January 1919, Gerow was called to Washington, D.C., where he was assigned to the Army Finance Office. His new task was to take charge of the payment of the bonus granted by Congress to the all honorably discharged soldiers who had served between April 6, 1917, and November 11, 1918, in World War I. He stayed in this capacity until June 1920. He then served with American forces in the Occupation of the Rhineland at Coblenz under Major General Henry T. Allen. One of his duties was showing Douglas Fairbanks and Mary Pickford around.

Gerow returned to the United States, where he was a student at the Infantry School at Fort Benning. He was the professor of military science and tactics at the University of Wisconsin from 1924 to 1925 and then at the Western Military Academy from 1925 to 1928. He graduated from the United States Army Command and General Staff College at Fort Leavenworth, Kansas in 1931, and served in the office of the Assistant Secretary of War, first Frederick Huff Payne and then Harry Hines Woodring. His next assignment was with the 4th Infantry at Fort George Wright in Washington state. He was professor of military science and tactics at the University of Washington from 1937 to 1938. He graduated from the Army War College in 1939 and the Naval War College and Army Industrial College in 1940.

== World War II ==
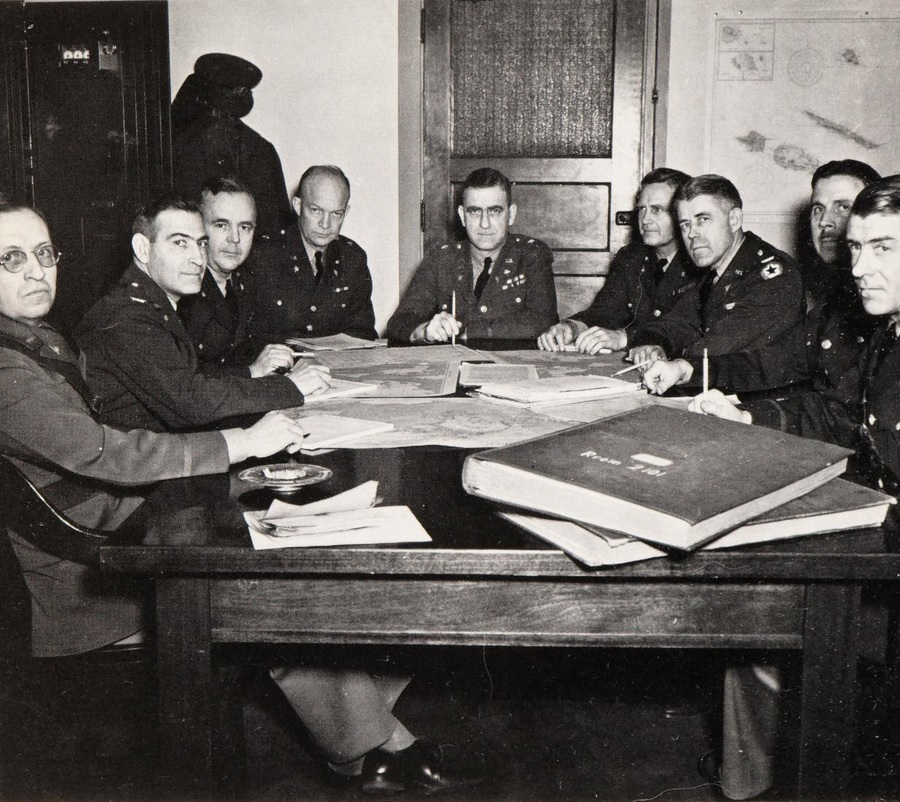
Meeting of the War Plans Division of the War Department General Staff in March 1942. Gerow is second from left; his brother Leonard is seated to the immediate left of Dwight D. Eisenhower.

Gerow served on the War Department General Staff as chief of the Theater Operations Group from February 21 to March 9, 1942, when he was succeeded by Brigadier General St. Clair Streett. Gerow was appointed a commander of the newly activated 338th Infantry, which was part of the 85th Infantry Division, under the command of Major General Wade Hampton Haislip. The regiment, which was stationed at Camp Shelby, Mississippi, conducted its basic infantry training under his direction. When Haislip became commander of XV Corps in February 1943, the assistant division commander, Brigadier General John B. Coulter, became division commander and Gerow succeeded him as assistant division commander, on Haislip's recommendation, with the rank of brigadier general from March 1943. He remained in this role for the duration of World War II.

After participating in large-scale maneuvers in Louisiana and California, the 85th Infantry Division moved to Fort Dix, New Jersey, in October 1943. Two months later, Gerow took an advance party of the division to Camp Patrick Henry, Virginia. On December 16, Gerow and his advance party boarded the ocean liner RMS Empress of Scotland at the Hampton Roads Port of Embarkation. The 85th Infantry Division became the second United States Army division activated after the United States entered the war to deploy overseas after the 88th Infantry Division, elements of which sailed on the same ship. Both divisions deployed to the Mediterranean Theater of Operations. Gerow led a party of key personnel, attached to the 88th Infantry Division in Italy to observe conditions at the front.

The 85th Infantry Division participated in the subsequent fighting in the Italian campaign, including the Third Battle of Monte Cassino in May 1944, the Gothic Line battles later that year and the Po Valley campaign in 1945. Most notably, due to the illness of its commander, Gerow led the 338th Infantry in the Battle of Altuzzo. The 85th Infantry Division returned to Hampton Roads in August 1945. Gerow's decorations included the Silver Star, the Legion of Merit, the Bronze Star Medal with oak leaf cluster, the Commendation Ribbon with oak leaf cluster and the French Croix de guerre 1939-1945.

== Later life ==
After the war ended, Gerow reverted to his permanent rank of colonel in February 1946. He then became the professor of military science at the Culver Military Academy in Colorado. He retired on a. disability in July 1949 with his wartime rank of brigadier general, and lived in Washington, D.C.

Gerow died from pneumonia on May 19, 1982, in the Veterans Health Administration Hospital in Washington, D.C., and was buried in Arlington National Cemetery. His papers are held by the Virginia Military Institute Archives.
