= 338th Infantry Regiment =

- Regimental Distinctive Unit Insignia
- Active: 1917-1919; 1921-1945; 1946–present
- Country: USA
- Branch: U.S. Army
- Role: Infantry
- Size: Regiment
- Part of: First Army
- Motto: Marchons
- Anniversaries: Constituted 5 August 1917 in the National Army
- Decorations: Presidential Unit Citation; Army Superior Unit Award
- Battle honours: World War I World War II

Commanders
- Notable commanders: Lee S. Gerow

Insignia
- The Regiment wears the 85th Division shoulder sleeve insignia

- First Army shoulder sleeve insignia (worn 2007-2018)

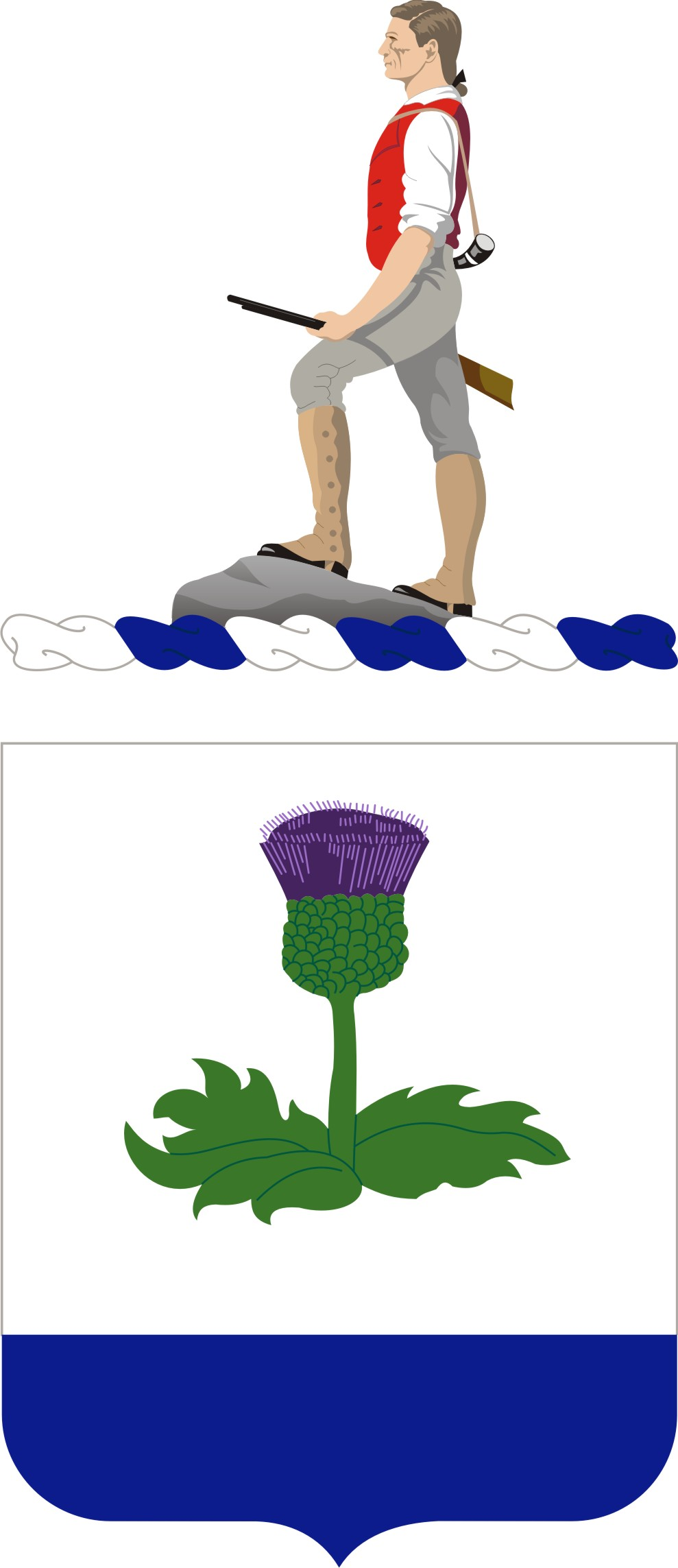
- Coat of Arms

The 338th Infantry Regiment was a National Army Infantry Regiment first organized for service in World War I as part of the 85th Infantry Division in Europe. It later served in the Mediterranean Theater during World War II. Since then it has served as a training regiment, training Army Reserve and Army National Guard soldiers for overseas service after the September 11 terrorist attacks.

== Service history ==
=== World War I ===
The regiment was constituted 5 August 1917 in the National Army as the 338th Infantry and assigned to the 169th Infantry Brigade of the 85th Division. It was organized at Camp Custer, Michigan, on 30 August 1917. In August 1917, the regiment was organized with 3,755 officers and enlisted men:

- Headquarters & Headquarters Company- 303
  - Supply Company- 140
  - Machine Gun Company- 178
  - Medical & Chaplain Detachment- 56
- Infantry Battalion (x3)- 1,026
  - Headquarters- 2
  - Rifle Company (x4)- 256

The Doughboys of the regiment deployed to France as part of the American Expeditionary Forces and were billeted in the cities of Nevers and Cosne. The regiment didn't participate in any named campaigns during the war; its Infantrymen were used as individual replacements to the fighting Divisions. After completing its war service in France it was demobilized at Camp Custer on 14 April 1919.

=== Interwar period ===
Pursuant to the National Defense Act of 1920, the 338th Infantry was reconstituted in the Organized Reserve on 24 June 1921, assigned to the 85th Division, and allotted to the Sixth Corps Area. It was initiated on 5 November 1921 with the regimental headquarters at Kalamazoo, Michigan. Subordinate battalion headquarters were organized as follows: 1st Battalion at Kalamazoo; 2nd Battalion at Lansing, Michigan; and 3rd Battalion at Ann Arbor, Michigan. The regimental headquarters was relocated on 20 July 1923 to Lansing. The 2nd and 3rd Battalions were relocated by 1929 to Hastings and Jackson, Michigan, respectively. The regimental headquarters was relocated on 26 September 1932 to Kalamazoo. The regiment conducted summer training most years with the 2nd Infantry Regiment at Camp Custer, Michigan. The regiment conducted summer training with the Michigan National Guard's 126th Infantry Regiment at Camp Grayling, Michigan, in 1928 and 1934. The regiment also conducted infantry Citizens' Military Training Camps some years at Camp Custer or Fort Brady, Michigan, as an alternate form of summer training. The primary ROTC "feeder" school was Michigan State College of Agriculture and Applied Science in Lansing.

=== World War II ===
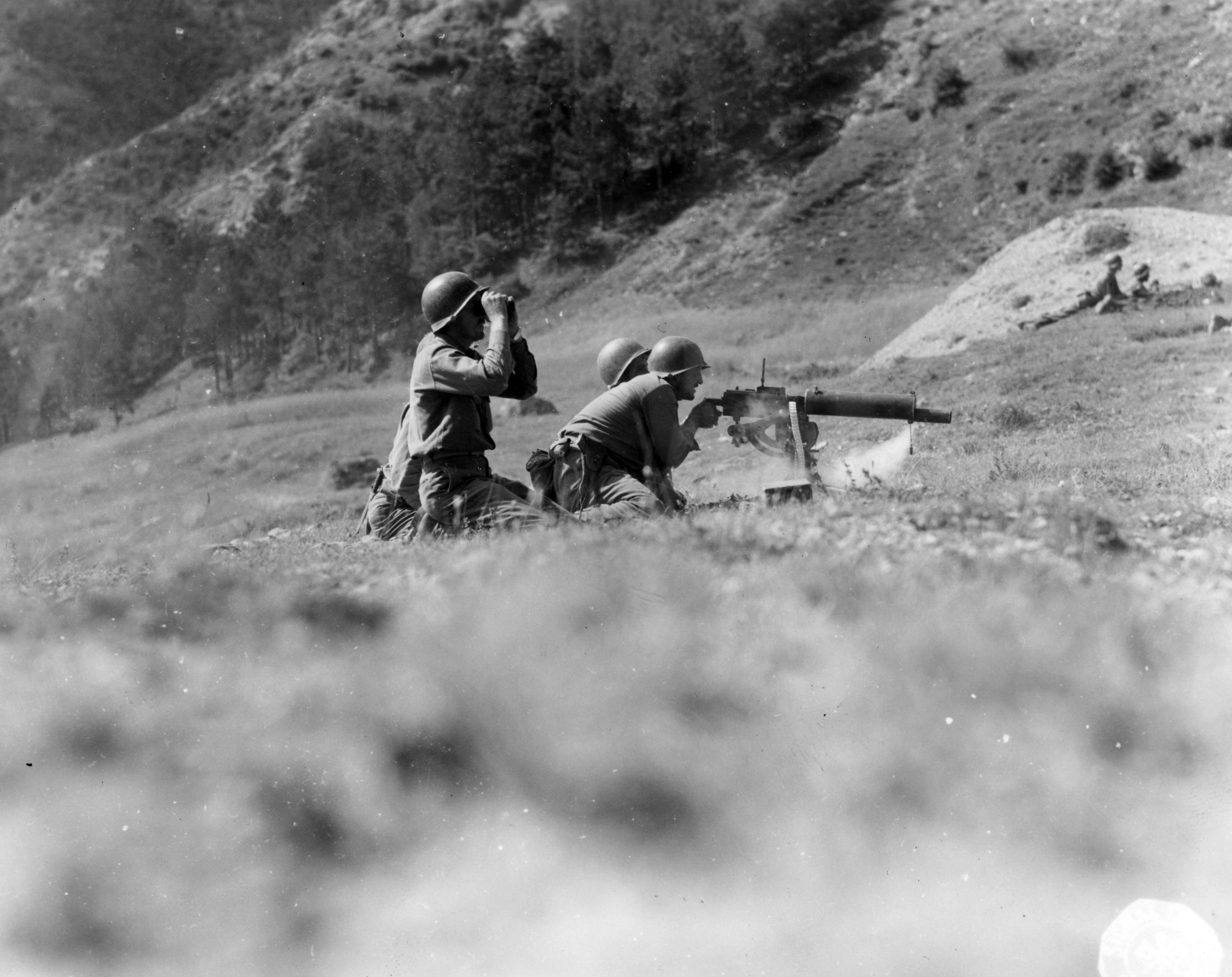
Machine gun crew of the 338th Infantry, 85th Division, firing at Germans carrying demolitions, 19 September 1944.

The 338th Infantry was ordered into active military service 15 May 1942 and reorganized at Camp Shelby, Mississippi. In July 1943, the regiment was organized with 3,256 officers and enlisted men:

- Headquarters & Headquarters Company- 111
  - Service Company- 114
  - Anti-Tank Company- 165
  - Cannon Company- 118
  - Medical Detachment- 135
- Infantry Battalion (x3)- 871
  - Headquarters & Headquarters Company- 126
  - Rifle Company (x3)- 193
  - Weapons Company- 156

The regiment departed Hampton Roads Port of Embarkation in December 1943 aboard the USS General William A. Mann with its supporting 329th Field Artillery Battalion. Arriving in Italy on March 14, the 339th Regimental Combat Team was attached to the 88th Infantry Division and became the first regiment of the 85th to see combat during World War II on the Minturno-Castelforte front north of Naples, on 28 March. After service in the Mediterranean Theater it was disbanded 25 August 1945 at Camp Patrick Henry, Virginia.

=== Post World War II ===
The 338th Infantry was reconstituted 6 November 1946 in the Organized Reserves and assigned to the 85th Infantry Division with headquarters at Peoria, Illinois. On 9 July 1952, the Organized Reserve was redesignated the Army Reserve. On 1 April 1952, the headquarters was relocated to Danville, Illinois. On 1 June 1959 the 338th Infantry was reorganized as a training unit and was redesignated as the 338th Regiment, an element of the 85th Division (Training), with headquarters at Chicago, Illinois.

=== Current assignment ===
As part of Operation Bold Shift, the 338th mission is to train Army Reserve and Army National Guard Soldiers for war service before dispatch to the War in Afghanistan, the Iraq War, or elsewhere. All three battalions are elements of the 85th Support Command under the operational control of First Army. As of 2018, the 1st Battalion is stationed at Fort McCoy, Wisconsin, with the 181st Infantry Brigade, while the 2nd and 3rd Battalions are stationed at Camp Atterbury, Indiana, with the 157th Infantry Brigade. Each battalion provides Observer/Controllers to the NTC and JRTC to train units conducting rotations as well as conducting exercises at their home stations.

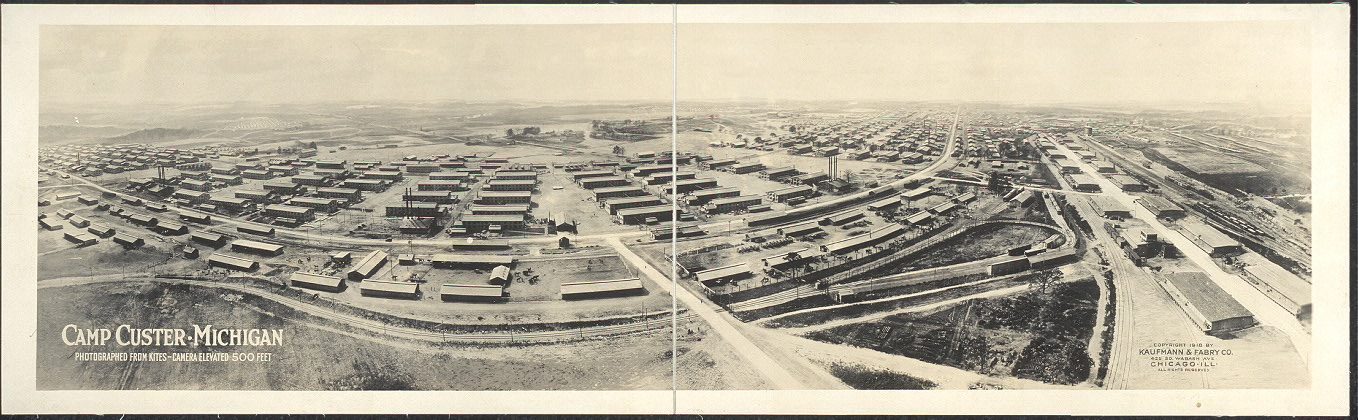
Camp Custer, Michigan

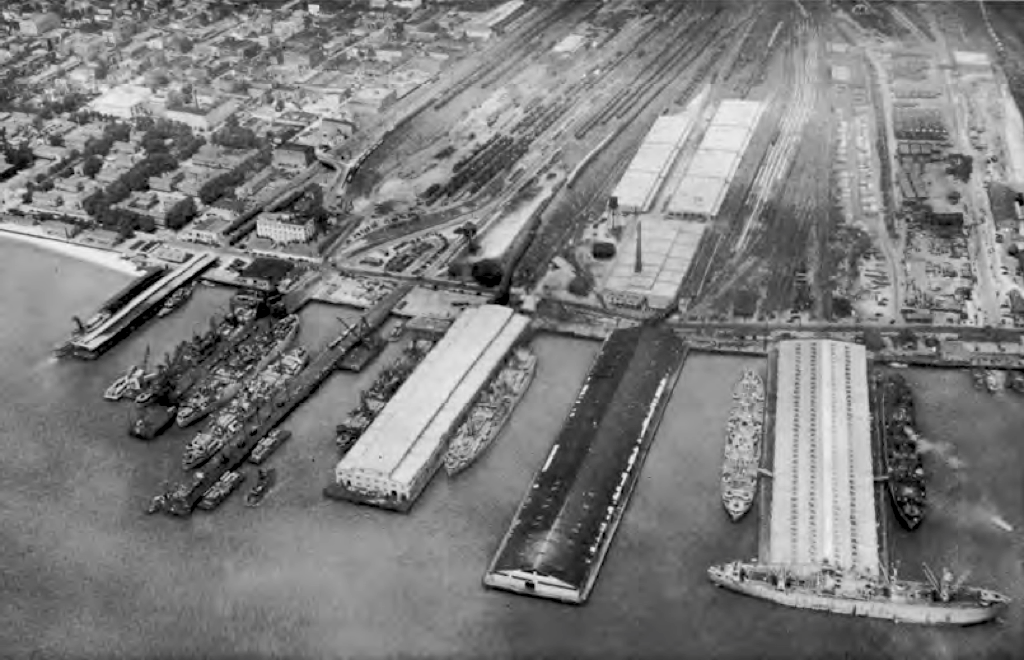
Hampton Roads Port of Embarkation

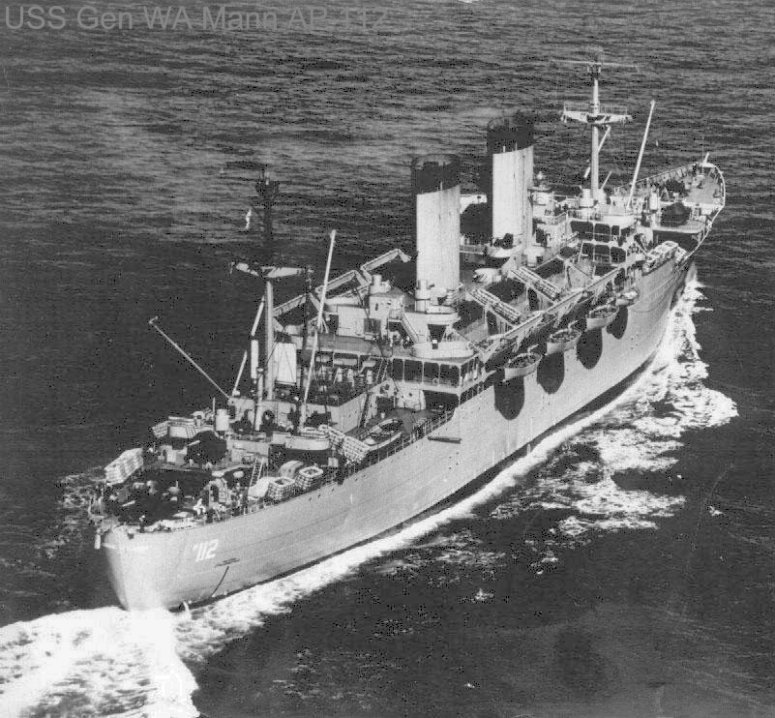
USS General W. A. Mann

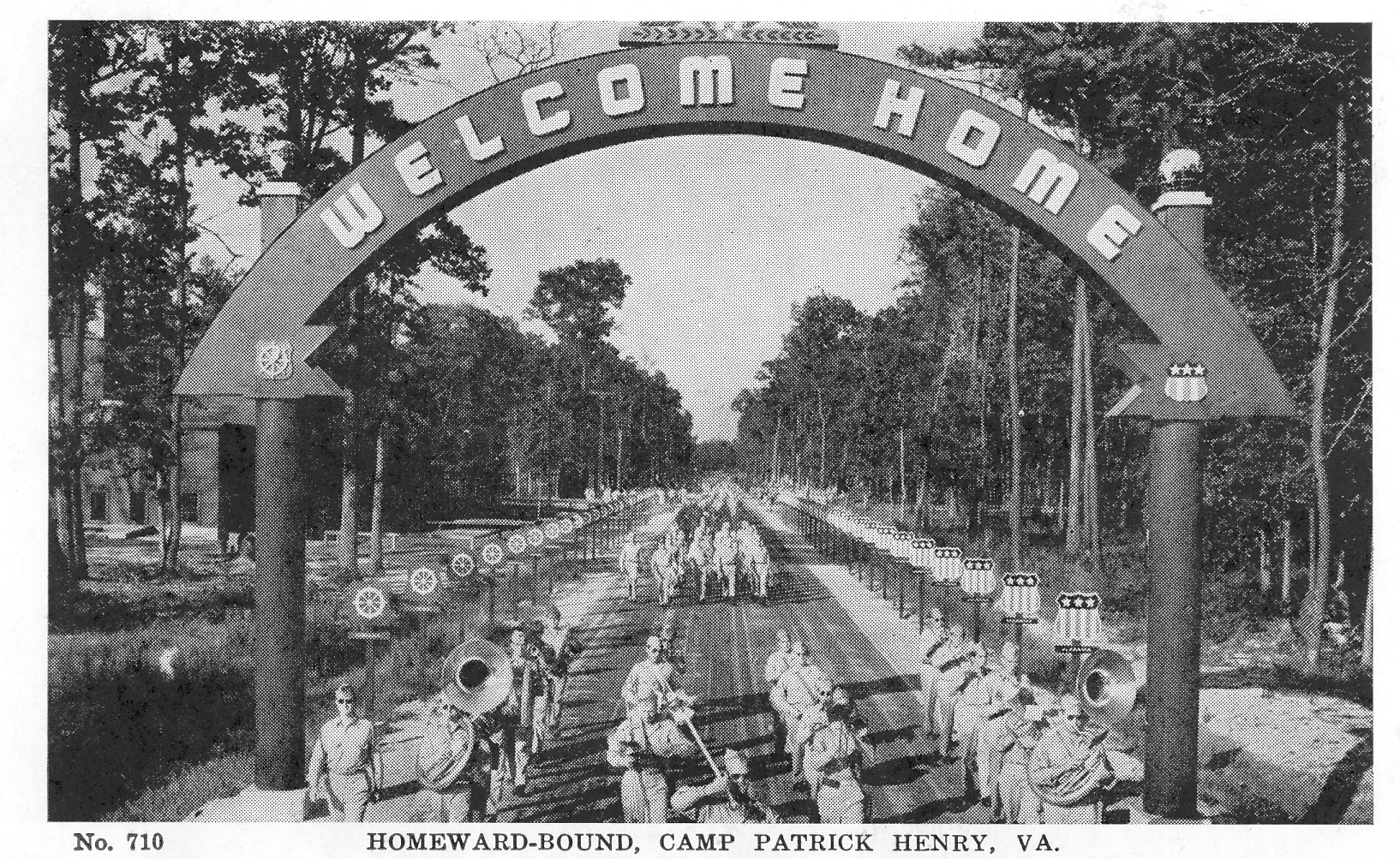
Welcome Home, Camp Patrick Henry

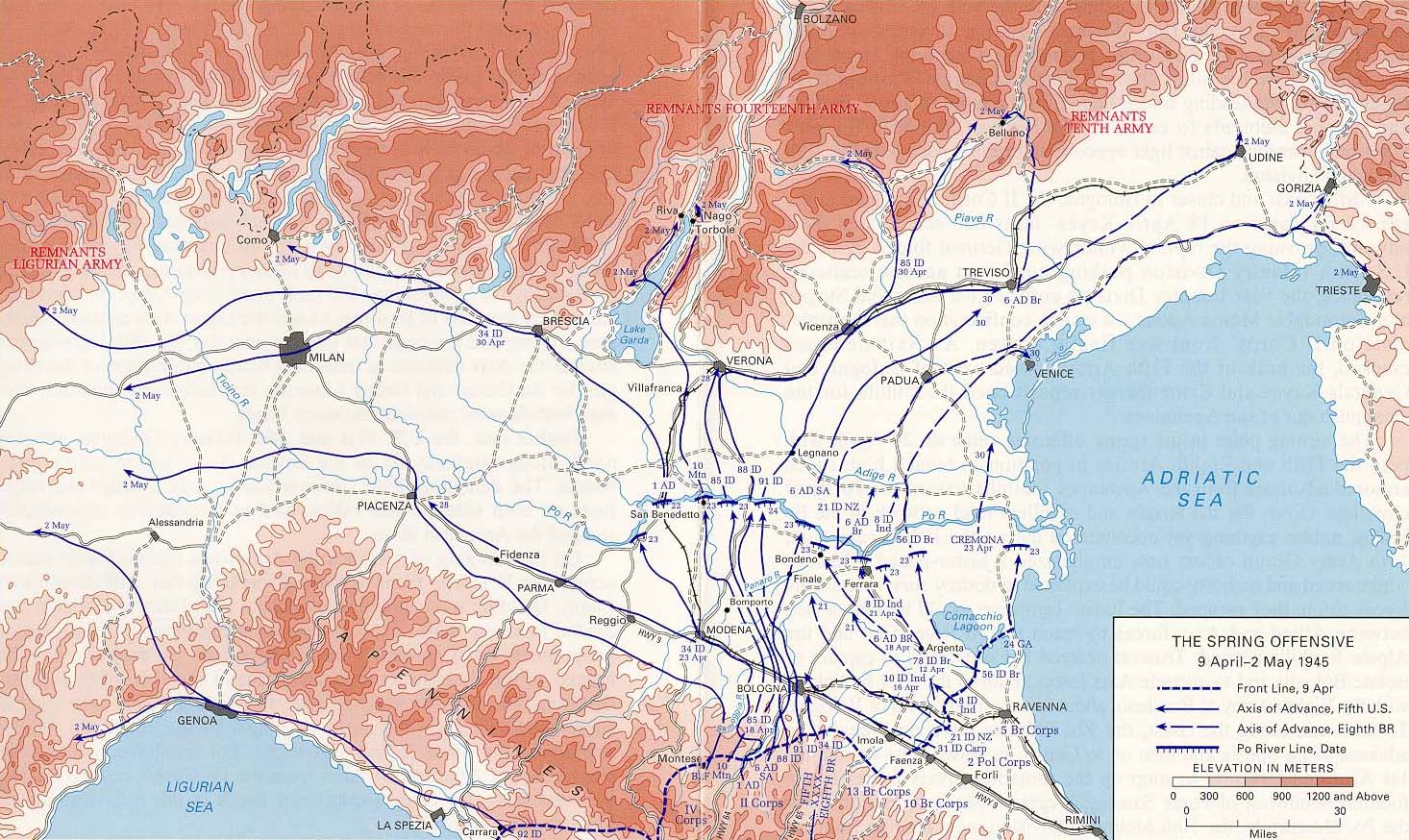
Spring Offensive, Italy 1945

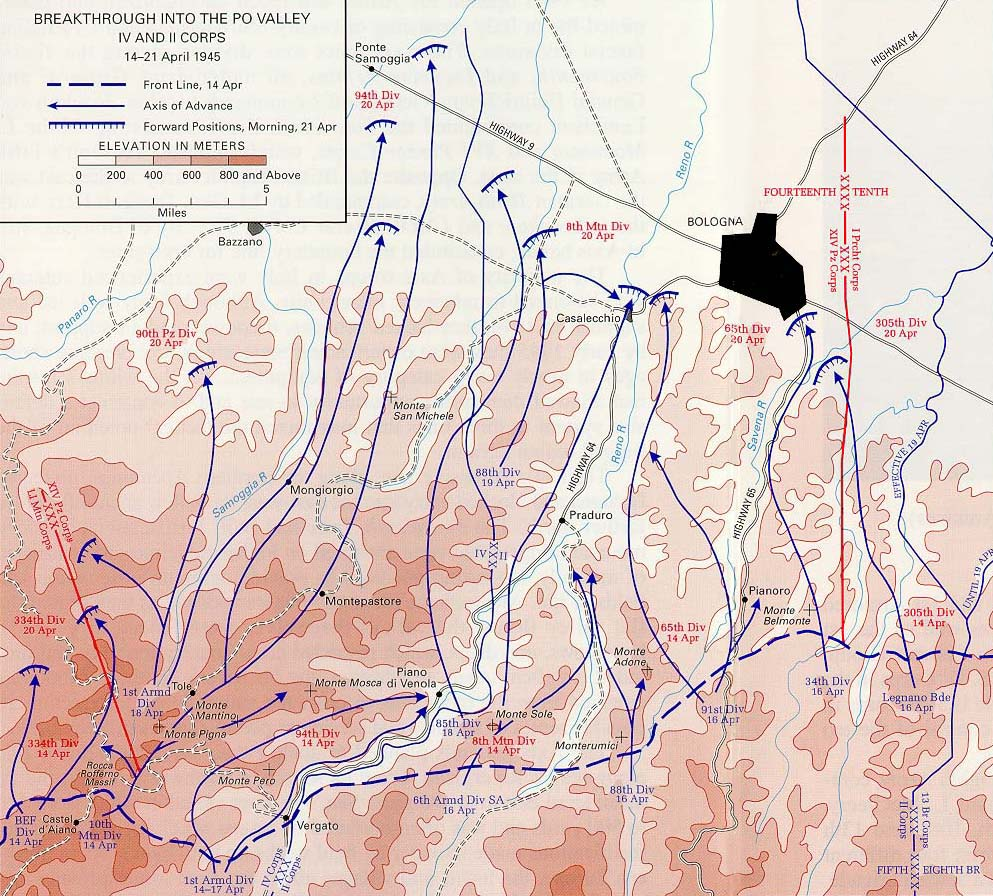
IV Corps operations, Italy April 1945

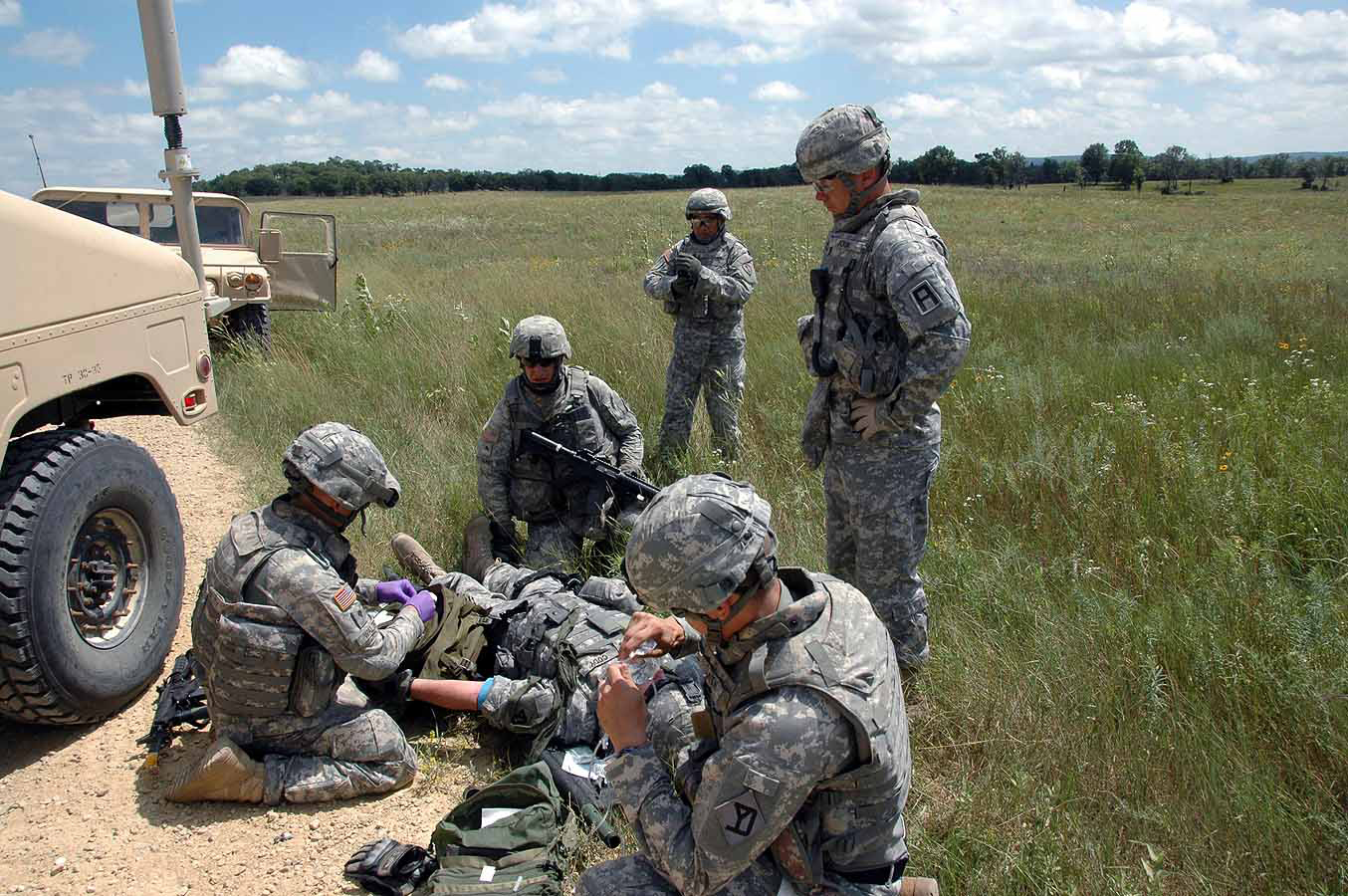
1st Battalion training deploying soldiers from the 101st Engineer Battalion September, 2009

== Campaign streamers ==
Conflict	Streamer	Year(s)
World War I	No Inscription	
World War II	Rome-Arno	1944
World War II	North Apennines	1944-1945
World War II	Po Valley	1945

== Decorations ==
Ribbon	Award	Year	Subordinate Elements	Embroidered	Notes
	Presidential Unit Citation	1944	Entire Regiment	Mount Altuzzo	General Orders #9, 21 October 1947
	Army Superior Unit Award	2003-2004	1st Battalion	2003-2004	Permanent Order 232-07, 20 August 2007 & General Order 2009-23
	Army Superior Unit Award	2004-2006	2nd and 3rd Battalions	2004-2006	Permanent Order 202-27, 21 July 2009 & General Order 2013-16
	Army Superior Unit Award	2008-2011	Entire Regiment	2008-2011	Permanent Orders 332-07 announcing award of the Army Superior Unit award
None	Secretary of the Army; Superior Unit Certificate	1961-1962	Headquarters Company, 3rd Battalion	None	DA GO 14, 20 March 1963
