= Leonard T. Gerow =

United States Army general (1888–1972)

Leonard Townsend Gerow
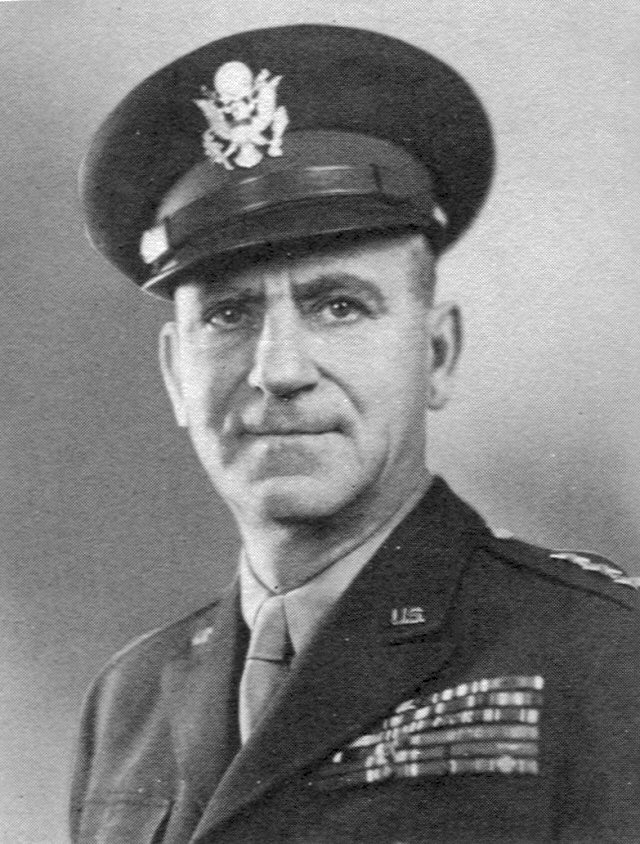
- Born: 13 July 1888; Petersburg, Virginia, United States
- Died: 12 October 1972 (aged 84); Fort Lee, Virginia, United States
- Burial place: Arlington National Cemetery, Virginia, United States
- Relatives: Lee S. Gerow (brother)
- Military career
- Allegiance: United States
- Branch: United States Army
- Service years: 1911–1950
- Rank: General
- Nickname: "Gee"
- Service number: 0-3151
- Unit: Infantry Branch
- Commands: 29th Infantry Division; V Corps; Fifteenth Army; United States Army Command and General Staff College; Second Army
- Conflicts: Banana Wars; United States occupation of Veracruz; World War I; Second Battle of the Marne; Battle of Saint-Mihiel; Meuse–Argonne offensive; Chinese Civil War; January 28 incident; World War II; Operation Overlord; Siegfried Line campaign; Battle of the Bulge; Western Allied invasion of Germany
- Awards: Army Distinguished Service Medal (3); Silver Star; Legion of Merit (2); Bronze Star

Leonard Townsend Gerow (13 July 1888 – 12 October 1972) was a general in the United States Army who served with distinction in both World War I and World War II.

A 1911 graduate of the Virginia Military Institute (VMI), Gerow served with the United States occupation of Veracruz and on the Signal Corps staff on the Western Front during World War I. After the war he attended the Infantry School, the Command and General Staff School, and the Army War College.

During World War II, he was the Chief of War Plans Division of the War Department General Staff. He would later be reprimanded for his actions in the lead up to the Japanese attack on Pearl Harbor. He commanded the 29th Infantry Division and then the V Corps. As such, Gerow played a major part in the planning of Operation Overlord, the invasion of continental Europe. He was the first corps commander ashore on D-Day, 6 June 1944, and continued in command through the Battle of Normandy, which saw his divisions sustain heavy casualties. He became the first American major general to enter Paris after its liberation. In January 1945, he assumed command of the Fifteenth Army.

== Early life ==
Leonard Townsend Gerow was born in Petersburg, Virginia, on 13 July 1888, the son of Leonard Rogers Gerow, a railroad conductor, and Annie Eloise Saunders. The name Gerow was derived from the French name "Giraud". He had three brothers and a sister.

Gerow attended high school in Petersburg and then attended the Virginia Military Institute (VMI). from which he graduated with a Bachelor of Science degree in 1911. He was three times elected class president, and was the recipient of the "Honor Appointment" which, at the time, permitted one man in each VMI graduating class to become a Regular Army second lieutenant without further examination. He was commissioned as a second lieutenant in the Infantry Branch of the United States Army on 29 September 1911. His brother Lee S. Gerow graduated from the VMI in 1913, and eventually rose to the rank of brigadier general.

== Early military career ==
Prior to World War I, Gerow served in a series of assignments as a company grade officer in the Infantry. In 1915 he won commendation for his work in the 1915 Galveston Hurricane. He also participated in the United States occupation of Veracruz. He was promoted to first lieutenant on 1 July 1916 and later to captain on 15 May 1917, shortly after the American entry into World War I on 6 April 1917.

From 16 January 1918 to 30 June 1920 Gerow served on the Signal Corps staff on the Western Front. He participated in the Second Battle of the Marne, Battle of Saint-Mihiel and the Meuse–Argonne offensive. He was promoted to the temporary rank of lieutenant colonel, in charge of purchasing all the radio equipment for the American Expeditionary Forces (AEF) in Belgium and France. For his services during the war he was awarded the Army Distinguished Service Medal and the French Legion of Honour. The citation for his Army DSM reads:

The President of the United States of America, authorized by Act of Congress, July 9, 1918, takes pleasure in presenting the Army Distinguished Service Medal to Lieutenant Colonel (Signal Corps) Leonard Townsend Gerow, United States Army, for exceptionally meritorious and distinguished services to the Government of the United States, in a duty of great responsibility during World War I. as Officer in Charge of the Sales and Disbursing Division of the Signal Corps. With unusual ability and skill, Lieutenant Colonel Gerow conducted the financial affairs of the Signal Corps and handled the negotiations with such tact and energy that Signal Corps property urgently needed was secured, inspected, and delivered to depots with the minimum of delay. Later, in the negotiations connected with the disposal of Signal Corps plants and stocks, he again performed his exacting duties in a highly meritorious manner, thereby rendering services of great value to the American Expeditionary Forces in a position of great responsibility.

After returning to the United States, he was promoted to the permanent rank of major on 1 July 1920. He attended the advanced course at the Infantry School at Fort Benning, Georgia, in the fall of 1924. He graduated first in the class in 1925 from the Advanced Course at the Infantry School. Omar Bradley graduated second. Gerow attended the Command and General Staff School, where Dwight D. Eisenhower was his study partner. In 1931 he completed the Field Officer's Course in Chemical Warfare and Tanks, and took a course at Army War College. His first wife, Kathryn Getchell, died on 17 June 1933. He then married to Mary Louise Kennedy, who died on 29 October 1970. He had no children.

Gerow served in China in 1932 in the Shanghai sector during the Shanghai Incident. On 1 August 1935 he was promoted to the permanent rank of lieutenant colonel. On 1 September 1940, prior to the American entry into World War II, he became a colonel in the permanent grade and a month later, on 1 October 1940, he became a temporary brigadier general.

== World War II ==
At the time of the attack on Pearl Harbor and the entry of the United States into World War II in December 1941, Gerow was Chief of War Plans Division of the war Department General Staff. He was promoted to temporary major general on 14 February 1942. On handing over the position of the Chief of War Plans Division to Dwight Eisenhower, Gerow told him: "Well, I got Pearl Harbor on the book; lost the PI [Philippine Islands], Sumatra and all the NEI [Netherlands East Indies] north of the barrier. Let's see what you can do."

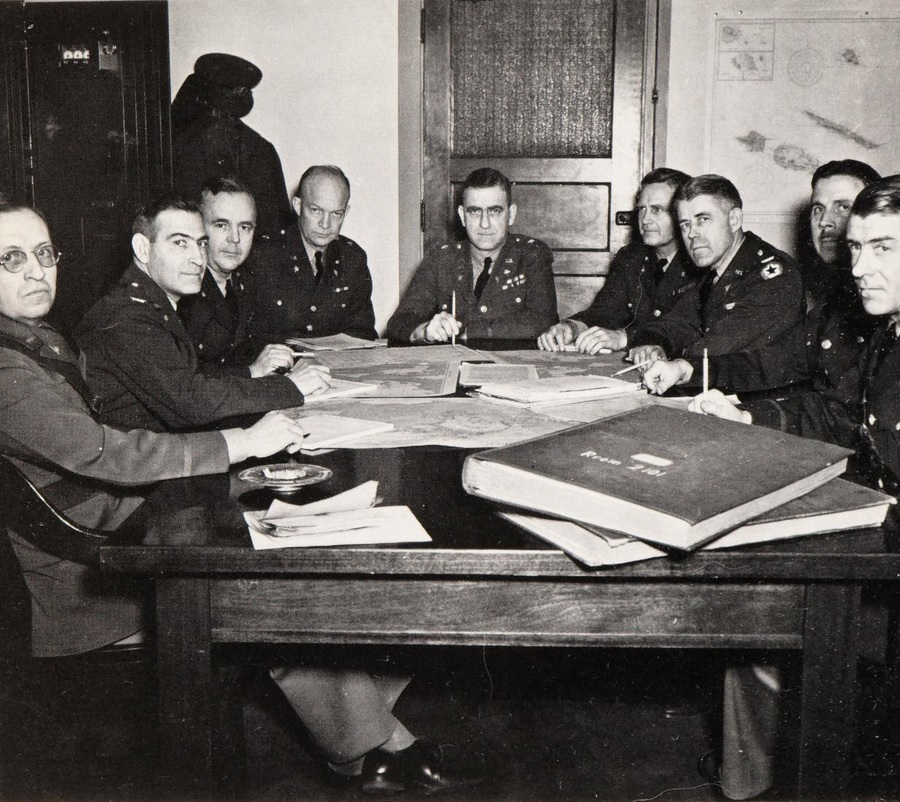
Meeting of the War Plans Division in March 1942. Gerow is at the head of the table next to Dwight D. Eisenhower; his brother Lee S. Gerow is second from the left

In October 1942, Gerow became Commanding General (CG) of the 29th Infantry Division, an Army National Guard formation recruiting largely from Virginia and Maryland, although the Chief of Staff of the United States Army, General George C. Marshall, had doubts about Gerow's ability. He received the Legion of Merit on 27 September 1943 for his work as a division commander and as Chief of Staff of the War Plans Division.

Lieutenant General Jacob L. Devers, the commander of the European Theater of Operations, United States Army (ETOUSA) selected Gerow to replace Major General Russell P. Hartle as commander of V Corps on 17 July 1943. At the time this was the largest unit of troops in ETOUSA. As such, Gerow played a major part in the planning of Operation Overlord, the invasion of continental Europe. When Eisenhower replaced Devers as theater commander, he and Bradley removed three other corps commanders, Willis D. Crittenberger, Emil F. Reinhardt and Roscoe B. Woodruff, and replaced them with three generals with combat experience in the war as division commanders, but they retained Gerow. He was awarded an oak leaf cluster to his Distinguished Service Medal on 8 August 1944, for his contributions to the planning phase of Operation Overlord.

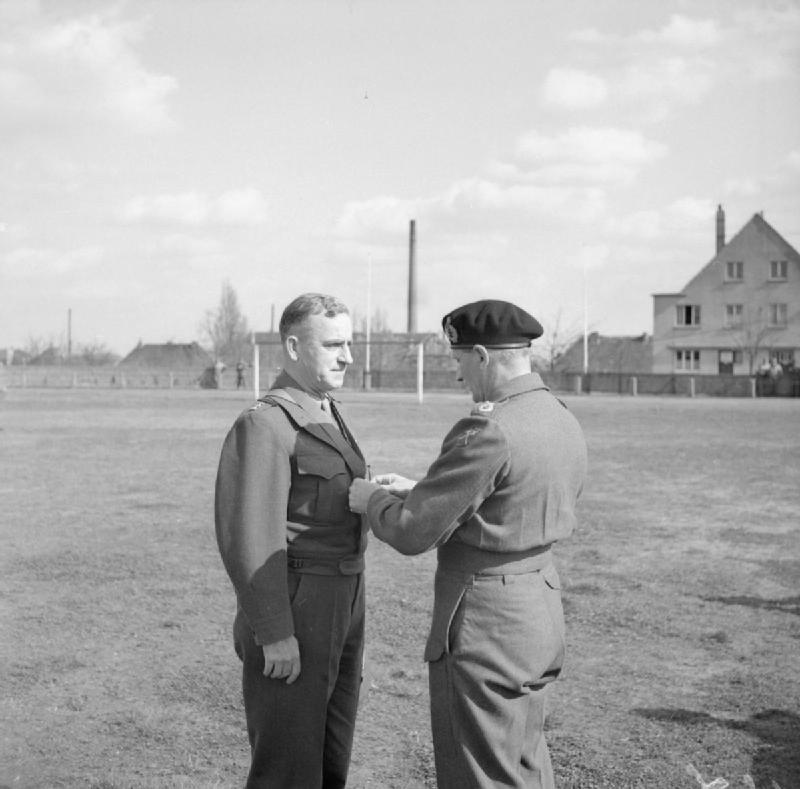
Gerow receives the Companion of the Order of the Bath from British Field Marshal Sir Bernard Montgomery at Munchen Gladbach

Gerow was the first corps commander ashore on D-Day, 6 June 1944, and continued in command through the Battle of Normandy, which saw his divisions sustain heavy casualties. V Corps was initially composed of two infantry divisions: the veteran 1st under Clarence R. Huebner and the green 29th, his old division, now commanded by Charles H. Gerhardt. He was the first American officer of the rank of major general to enter Paris after its liberation by the French 2nd Armored Division and the U.S. 4th Infantry Division. For his part in this campaign he was awarded the Silver Star. His citation read:

For gallantry in action against the enemy on 25 August 1944 in France. While fighting was still raging in and around Paris, Major General Gerow, displaying marked valor, courageously drove through intense 20 mm machine gun and sniper fire to reach the city. Although many intersections were blocked with barricades manned by German troops, he proceeded unhesitatingly through the dangerous streets to effect an important conference with the Commanding General of the French forces within the city. Major General Gerow's gallant action was an inspiration to the members of his command and reflects great credit upon himself and the military service.

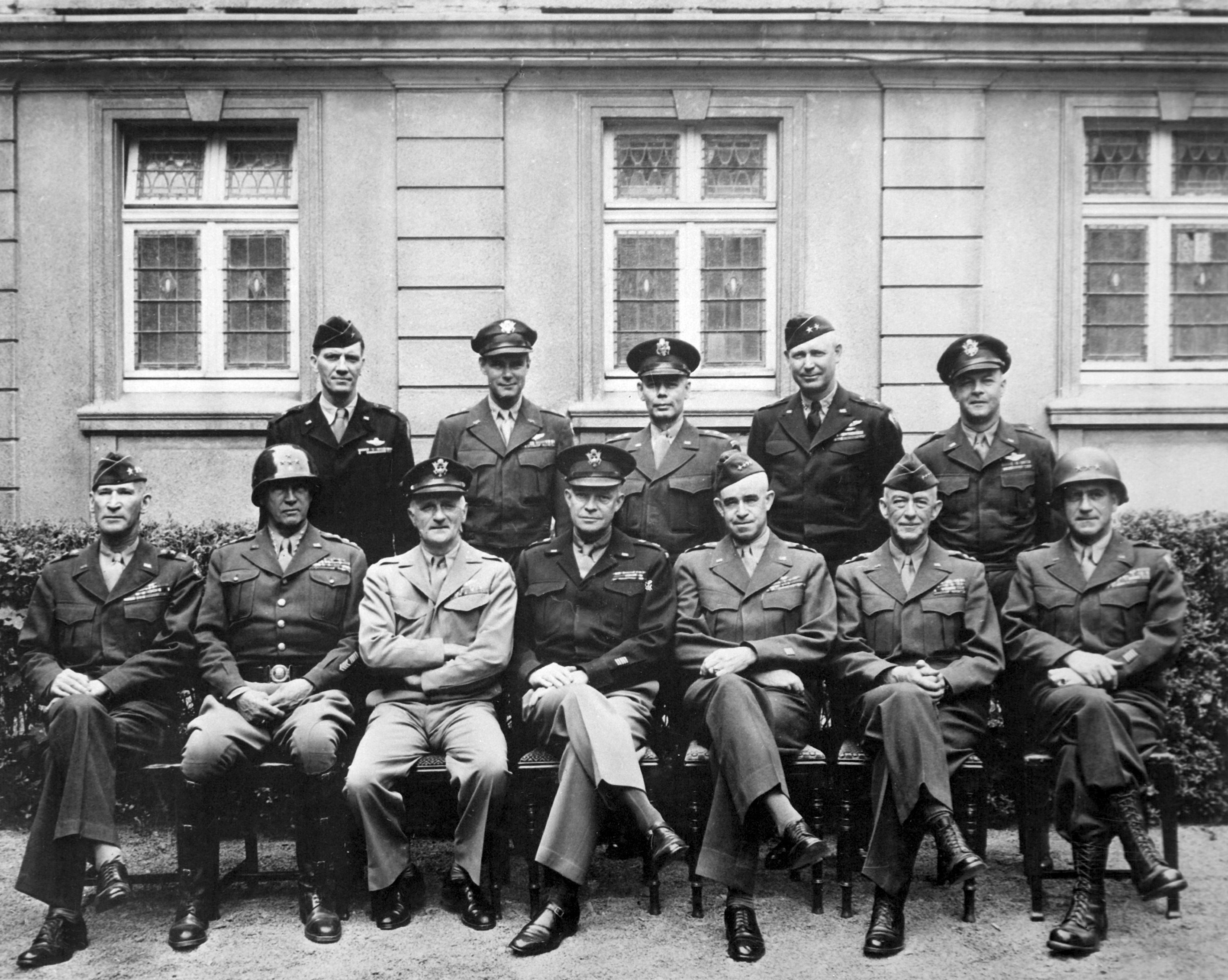
Senior American commanders of the European theater of World War II. Seated, from left to right, are William H. Simpson, George S. Patton, Carl A. Spaatz, Dwight D. Eisenhower, Omar Bradley, Courtney Hodges and Gerow.

Gerow commanded V Corps from 17 July 1943 to 17 September 1944 and again from 5 October 1944 to 14 January 1945. In the gap between the two periods of command he returned to the United States to appear before the Army Board's Pearl Harbor Investigation. The resulting Clausen Report found fault with Gerow's performance, citing his failure to keep Lieutenant General Walter Short fully informed and to give him clear guidance.

Eisenhower and Bradley held Gerow in high regard and ranked him as one of the top American field commanders of World War II. In a February 1945 memo General Eisenhower listed the principal American commanders in order of merit based on the value of their service during the war. Gerow was listed 8th of 32. In a letter to Marshall on 26 April 1945, regarding commanders who might go on to serve in the Pacific, Eisenhower commended Bradley most highly and then said: "In Europe there are other men who have been thoroughly tested as high combat commanders, including Simpson, Patch, Patton, Gerow, Collins, Truscott and others. Any one of these can successfully lead an army in combat in the toughest kind of conditions."

Gerow was given command of the newly formed Fifteenth Army on 15 January 1945. He was promoted to lieutenant general on 6 February 1945, with the promotion being effective 1 January 1945.

== Post–World War II career ==
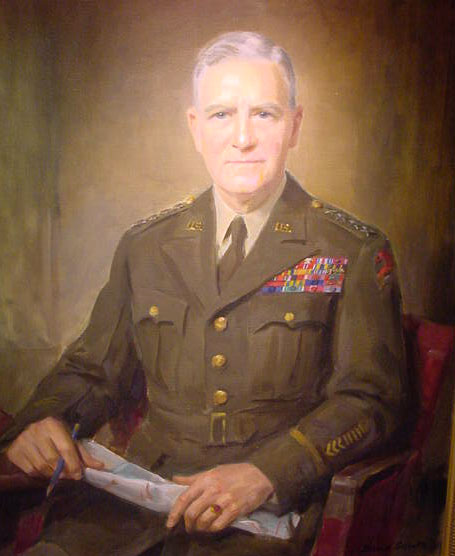
Portrait of Leonard T. Gerow

Eisenhower at the Command and General Staff College at Fort Leavenworth, Kansas, with Lieutenant General Leonard T. Gerow and CMO Williams, February 14, 1946.

After the war Gerow was appointed Commandant of the Command and General Staff College. He was placed in charge of a board which studied and proposed how army colleges ought to be organized, post war. In February 1946 the Gerow Board recommended five separate colleges. In January 1948, he was appointed Commanding General of the Second Army. This was his last post; he retired from the army, after almost 40 years service, on 31 July 1950. He was promoted to the rank of full general on 19 July 1954 by a special Act of Congress (Public Law 83-508).

Gerow died at Kenner Army Hospital at Fort Lee, Virginia, on 12 October 1972, and was buried in Arlington National Cemetery. His papers are in the Virginia Military Institute archives.

== Awards and decorations ==
Army Distinguished Service Medal with two oak leaf clusters
Silver Star with two oak leaf clusters
Legion of Merit with oak leaf cluster
Bronze Star with oak leaf cluster
Air Medal
Mexican Border Service Medal
World War I Victory Medal
American Defense Service Medal
American Campaign Medal
European-African-Middle Eastern Campaign Medal with four campaign stars
World War II Victory Medal
Army of Occupation Medal with "Germany" clasp
Order of the Bath, Companion (Great Britain)
Order of Suvorov Second Class (Union of Soviet Socialist Republics)
Legion of Honour, Commander (France)
Croix de guerre with palm (France)
Order of Leopold II, Grand Officer with Palm (Belgium)
Croix de guerre with palm (Belgium)
Order of the Oak Crown, Grand Officer (Luxembourg)
Order of Military Merit (Chile), First Class
Order of the Ayacucho, Grand Official (Peru)
Order of Military Merit, Grand Officer (Brazil)
Order of Aeronautical Merit, Grand Officer (Brazil)

== Dates of rank ==
Insignia	Rank	Component	Date
No insignia in 1911	Second lieutenant	Regular Army	29 September 1911
	First lieutenant	Regular Army	1 July 1916
	Captain	Regular Army	15 May 1917
	Major	National Army	7 June 1918
	Lieutenant colonel	Temporary	22 October 1918
	Major	Regular Army	1 July 1920
	Lieutenant colonel	Regular Army	1 August 1935
	Colonel	Regular Army	1 September 1940
	Brigadier general	Army of the United States	1 October 1940
	Major general	Army of the United States	14 February 1942
	Brigadier general	Regular Army	2 June 1944
	Lieutenant general	Army of the United States	1 January 1945
	Major general	Regular Army	1 January 1947
	Lieutenant general	Retired List	31 July 1950
	General	Retired List	19 July 1954

== Notes ==
Military offices
Preceded by Milton Reckord	Commanding General 29th Infantry Division; 1942–1943	Succeeded by Charles H. Gerhardt
Preceded by Russell P. Hartle	Commanding General V Corps; 1943–1944	Succeeded by Edward H. Brooks
Preceded by Ray E. Porter	Commanding General Fifteenth Army; January 1945 – October 1945	Succeeded by George S. Patton
Preceded by Karl Truesdell	Commandant of the Command and General Staff College; 1945–1948	Succeeded by Manton S. Eddy
Preceded by John T. Lewis	Commanding General Second Army; 1948–1950	Succeeded by James Van Fleet
