= 337th Infantry Regiment (United States) =

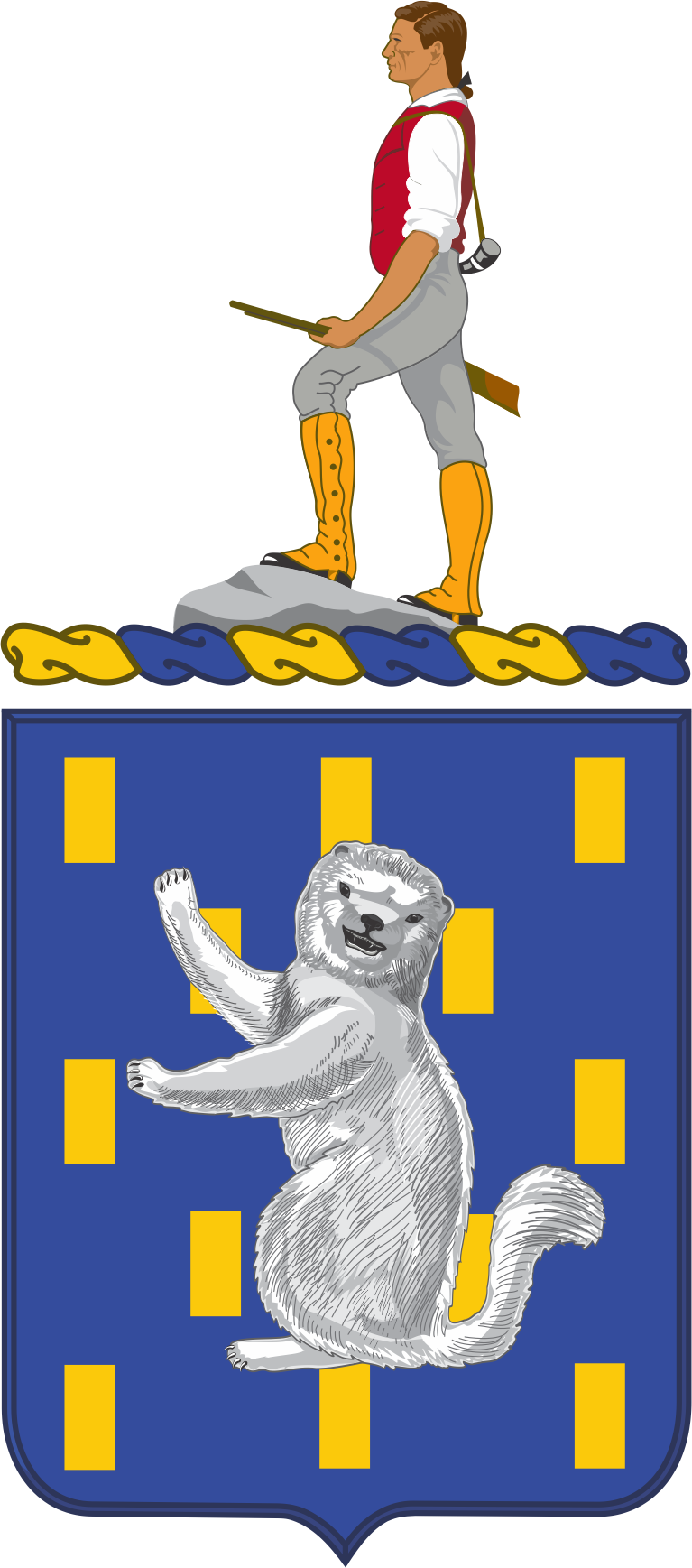
- Regimental coat of arms
- Active: 1917–1919; 1921–1945; 1946–present
- Country: USA
- Branch: U.S. Army
- Role: Infantry
- Size: Regiment
- Part of: First Army
- Mottos: Vis et Virtus (Strength and Courage)
- Anniversaries: Constituted 5 August 1917 in the National Army "Salerno Day" 9 September 1944
- Decorations: Army Superior Unit Award
- Battle honours: World War I World War II

Commanders
- Notable commanders: Colonel G. R. Schweickert; Colonel Oliver W. Hughes

Insignia
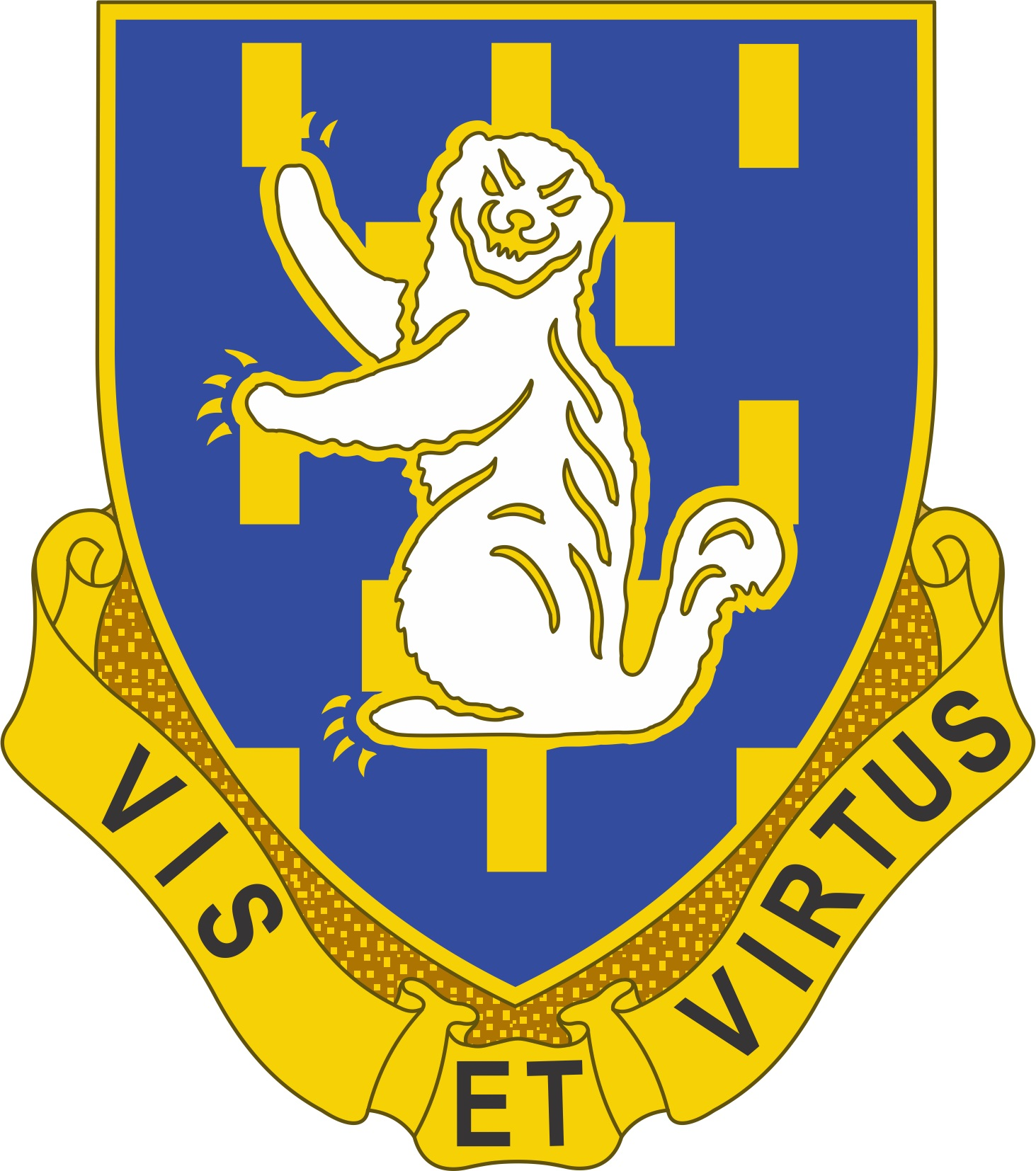
- Distinctive unit insignia

The 337th Infantry Regiment was an American National Army Infantry Regiment first organized for service in World War I as part of the 85th Division. It later served in the Mediterranean Theater during World War II. Since then it has served as a training regiment, training Army Reserve and Army National Guard soldiers for overseas service.

== Service history ==
=== World War I ===
The regiment was constituted 5 August 1917 in the National Army as the 337th Infantry and assigned to the 169th Infantry Brigade of the 85th Division. It was organized at Camp Custer, Michigan, on 30 August 1917. Its initial commander was Walter Cowen Short. In August 1917, the regiment was organized with 3,755 officers and enlisted men:

- Headquarters & Headquarters Company- 303
  - Supply Company- 140
  - Machine Gun Company- 178
  - Medical & Chaplain Detachment- 56
- Infantry Battalion (x3)- 1,026
  - Headquarters- 2
  - Rifle Company (x4)- 256

The regiment deployed to France as part of the American Expeditionary Forces and were billeted in Sancerre from August 14 to September 2, 1918. On September 4, they moved to the cities of Nevers and Cosne where they were trained until the end of the war. The 337th Infantry did not participate in any named campaigns; instead the regiment provided individual replacement soldiers for divisions engaged in combat. After completing its war service in France, it arrived at the port of New York aboard S.S. Leviathan on April 2, 1919. The regiment demobilized at Camp Custer on April 23, 1919.

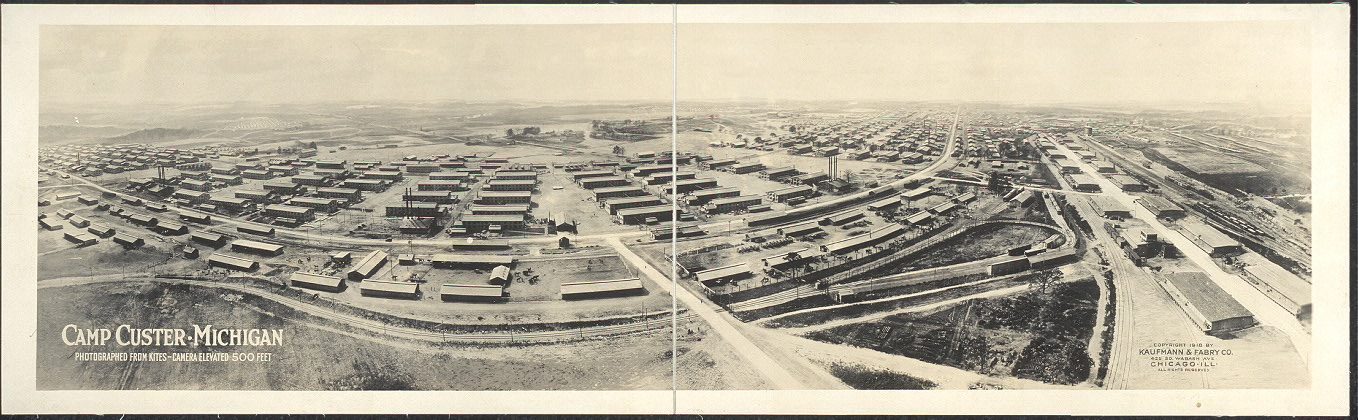
Camp Custer, Michigan

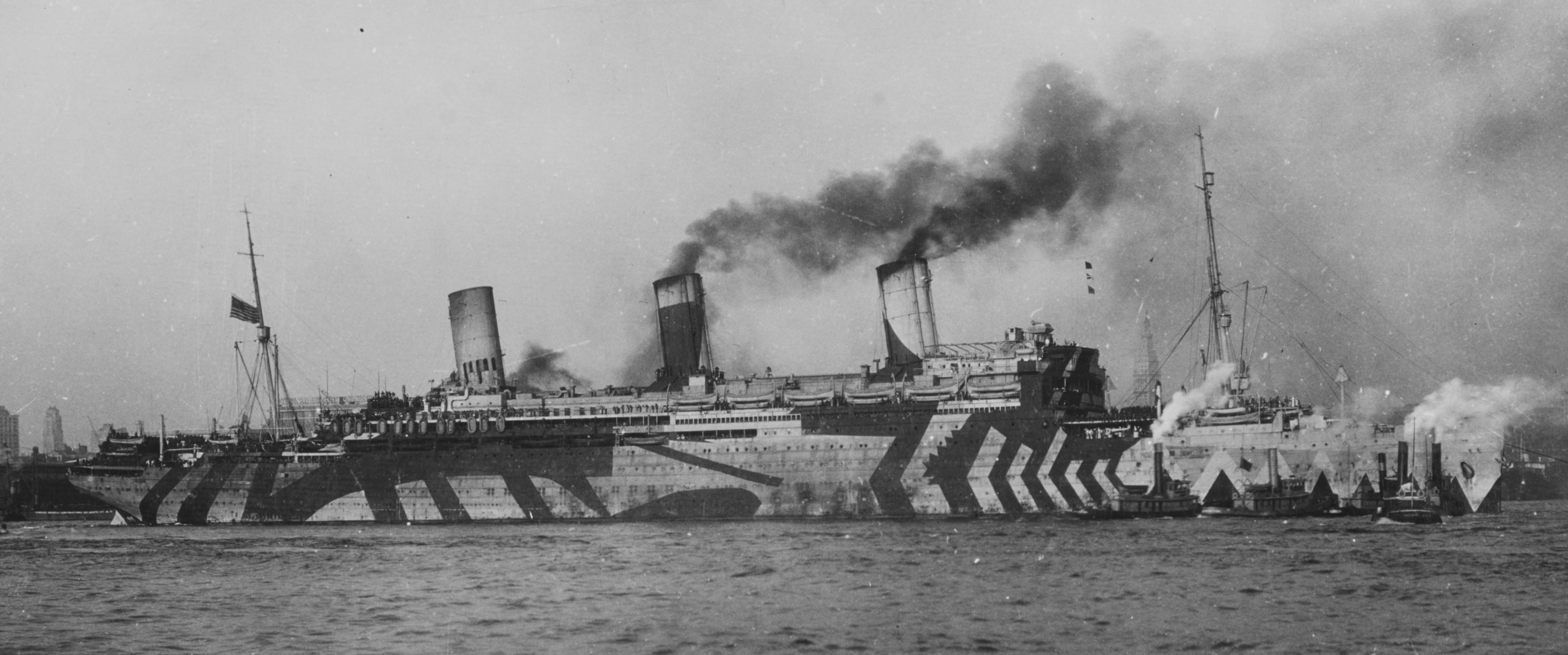
SS Leviathan, the former Hamburg-Amerika liner Vaterland, sports wartime camouflage paint to help hide her from German U-boats.

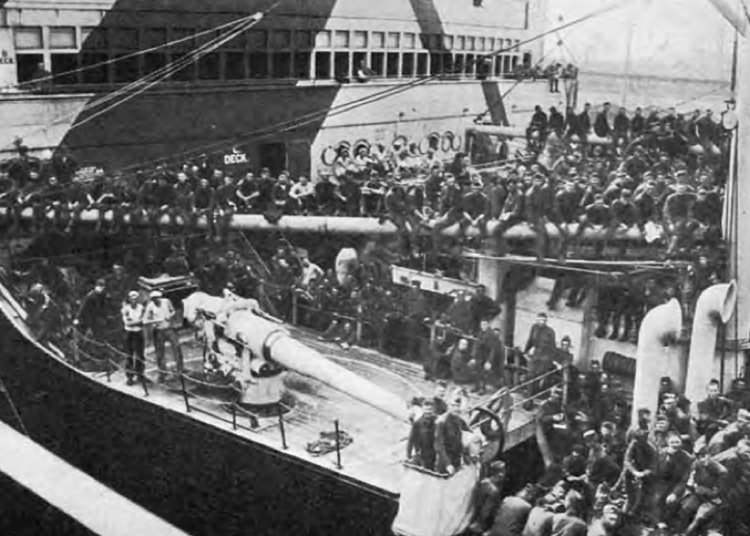
SS Leviathan leaving for France with 11,000 American troops

=== Between the Wars ===
The regiment was reconstituted in the Organized Reserves as the 337th Infantry on 24 June 1921 and reassigned to the 85th Division (later redesignated as the 85th Infantry Division) in the Sixth Corps Area. It was organized in December 1921 with the Regimental Headquarters and the 1st and 2d Battalions at Grand Rapids and the 3rd Battalion at Sault Ste Marie, Michigan. The 2nd and 3rd Battalions relocated by 1929 to Muskegon and Cadillac respectively. The regiment conducted summer training most years with the 2nd Infantry Regiment at Camp Custer. In 1928 the regiment conducted joint summer training with the Michigan National Guard’s 126th Infantry Regiment at Camp Grayling, while in 1934 the regiment conducted joint summer training with the 125th Infantry Regiment at Camp Grayling. They also conducted infantry Citizens Military Training Camp (CMTC) training some years at Camp Custer or Fort Brady, as an alternate form of summer training. The primary ROTC feeder school for new Reserve lieutenants for the regiment was Michigan State College of Agriculture and Applied Science.

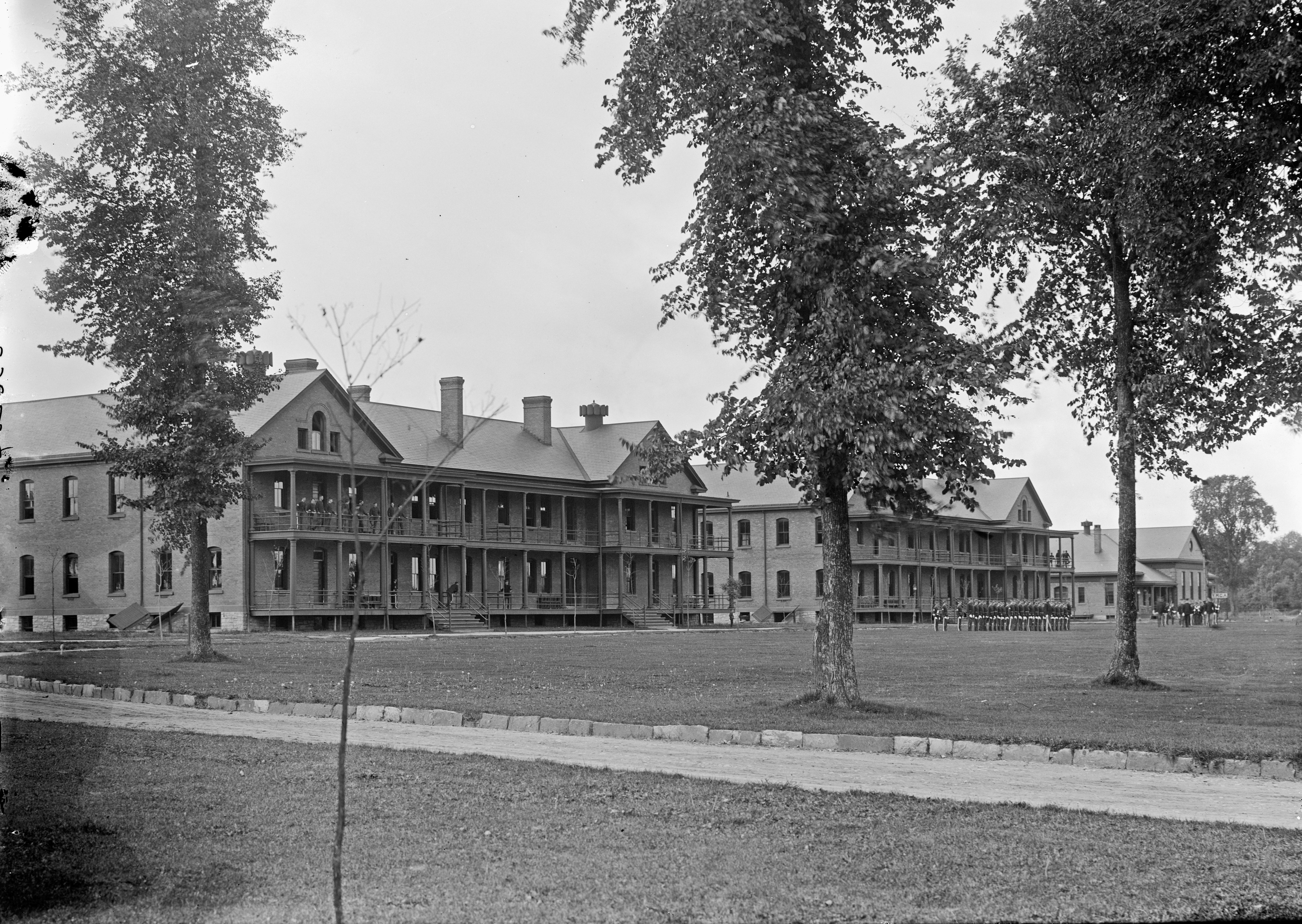
Fort Brady Barracks circa 1908

=== World War II ===
The regiment was ordered into active military service 15 May 1942 and reorganized at Camp Shelby, Mississippi, using a cadre provided by the 2nd Infantry Division. The regiment participated in the #2 Louisiana Maneuvers in April 1943 and the Desert Training Center #3 California Maneuvers in June 1943. In July 1943, the regiment was organized with 3,256 officers and enlisted men:

- Headquarters & Headquarters Company- 111
  - Service Company- 114
  - Anti-Tank Company- 165
  - Cannon Company- 118
  - Medical Detachment- 135
- Infantry Battalion (x3)- 871
  - Headquarters & Headquarters Company- 126
  - Rifle Company (x3)- 193
  - Weapons Company- 156

It departed Hampton Roads Port of Embarkation aboard HMS Andes on 24 December 1943, landed in Casablanca, French Morocco, on 2 January 1944 and received amphibious warfare training at Port aux Poules. It arrived in Naples, Italy on 27 March 1944. The 337th participated in the Rome-Arno, North Apennines, and the Po Valley campaigns in the Mediterranean Theater as part of the Italian Campaign. The regiment usually fought as a Regimental Combat Team with the addition of the 328th Field Artillery Battalion, Company A, 310th Engineer Battalion and Company A, 310th Medical Battalion attached. It saw heavy combat attacking the German's Gustav and Gothic Lines as they moved north up the Italian Peninsula during Operation Diadem. The regiment initially held defensive positions north of the Garigliano River until it attacked and seized Castellonorato until it was stopped by German resistance south of Monte Campese on 16 May 1944. The regiment began a drive on Terracina on 21 May that on the 24th opened the road to the Anzio beach head. Over the next month, the regiment fought through Monte Artemisio and Lariano. In June the 337th captured Monte Ceraso and advanced to the Viterbo River before being relieved on 10 June 1944. The regiment relieved the 2nd New Zealand Division on the Arno River Line on 16 August. On 17 August the 337th seized Mount Pratone. By 18 September, the division had penetrated the Gothic Line. On 1 October, Sergeant Chris Carr of Company L earned the Medal of Honor for actions near Guignola, Italy. The 85th Division went on the defensive near Pizzano from 27 October through 22 November 1944. On 9 January 1945, the 85th relieved the British 1st Infantry Division near Monte Grande and then the 1st Armored Division on 17 April as part of Operation Grapeshot. On 26 April the division crossed the Adige River in the Verona area and by 1 May was clearing the Piave Valley. The German forces in Italy surrendered on 2 May 1945. The regiment departed Fagianeria, Italy for Hampton Roads and was inactivated at Camp Patrick Henry, Virginia, on 25 August 1945.

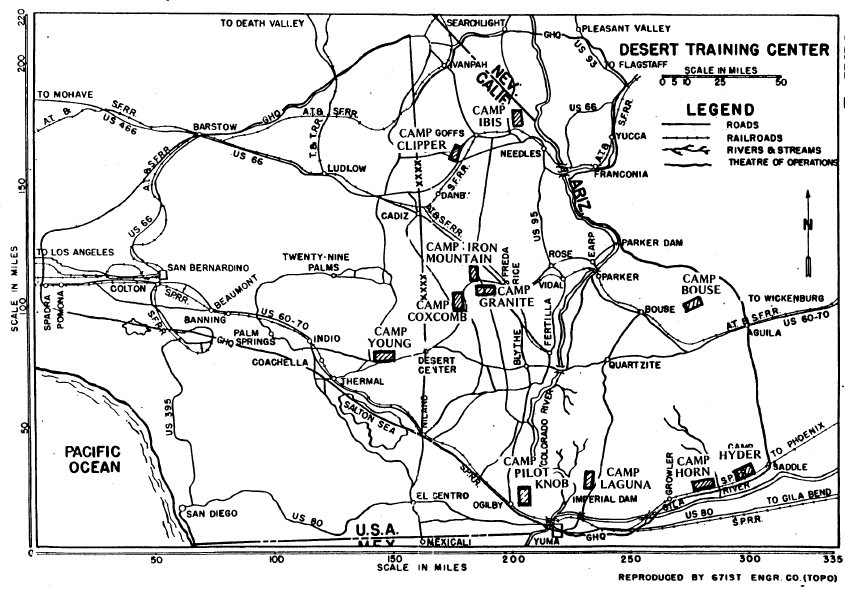
Map of the Desert Training Center

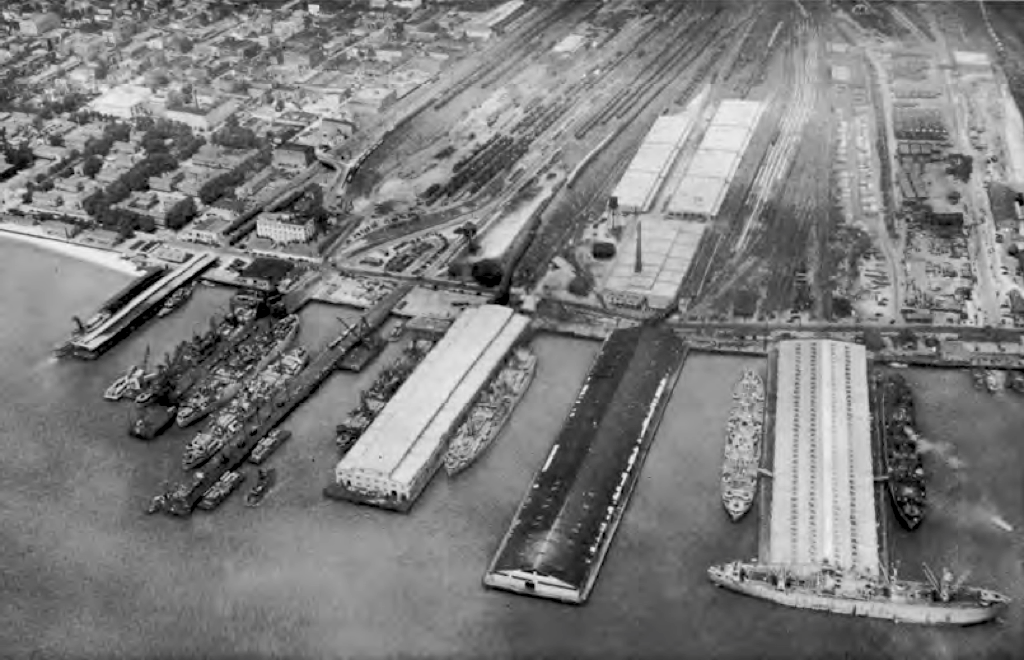
Hampton Roads Port of Embarkation

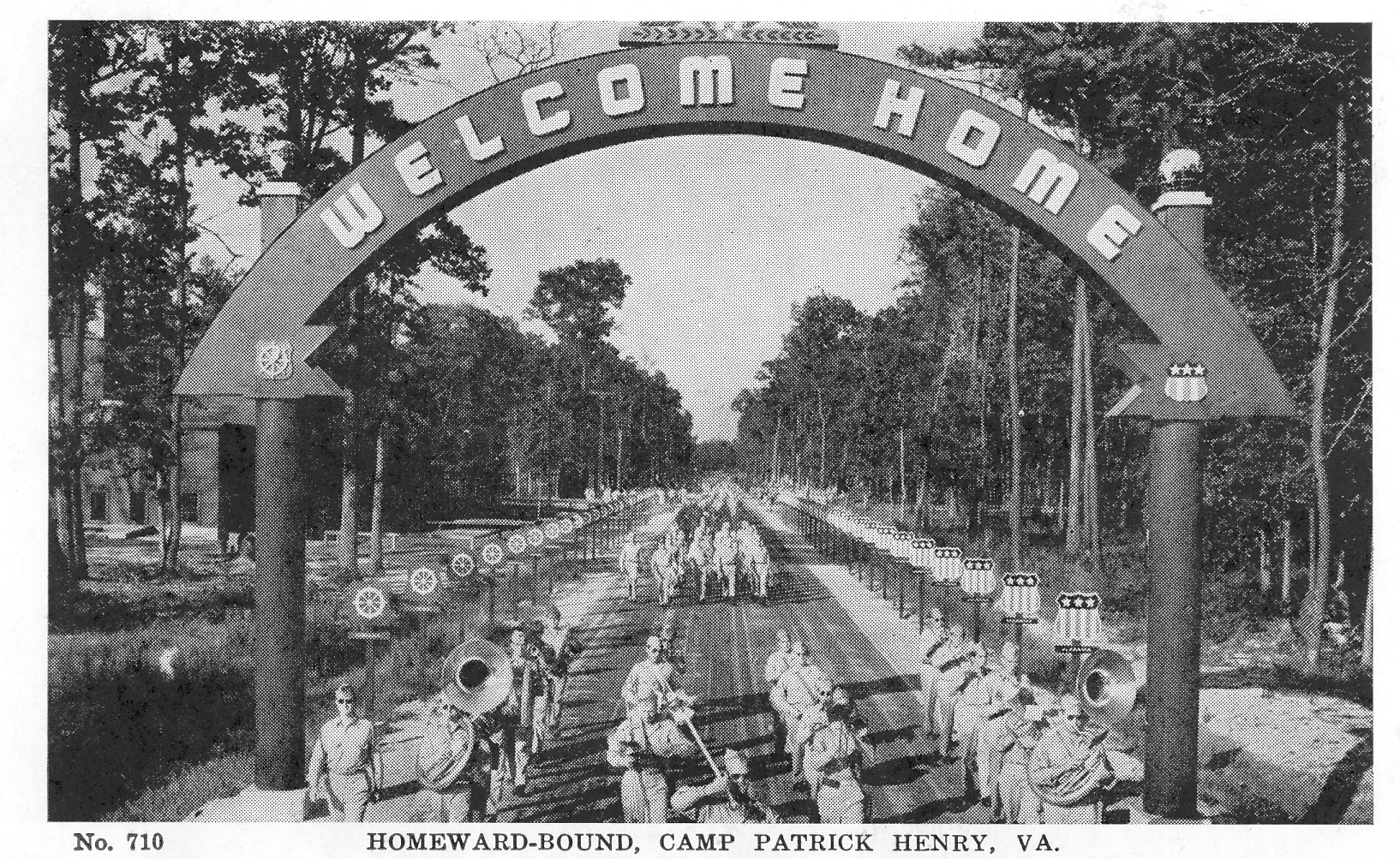
Welcome Home, Camp Patrick Henry

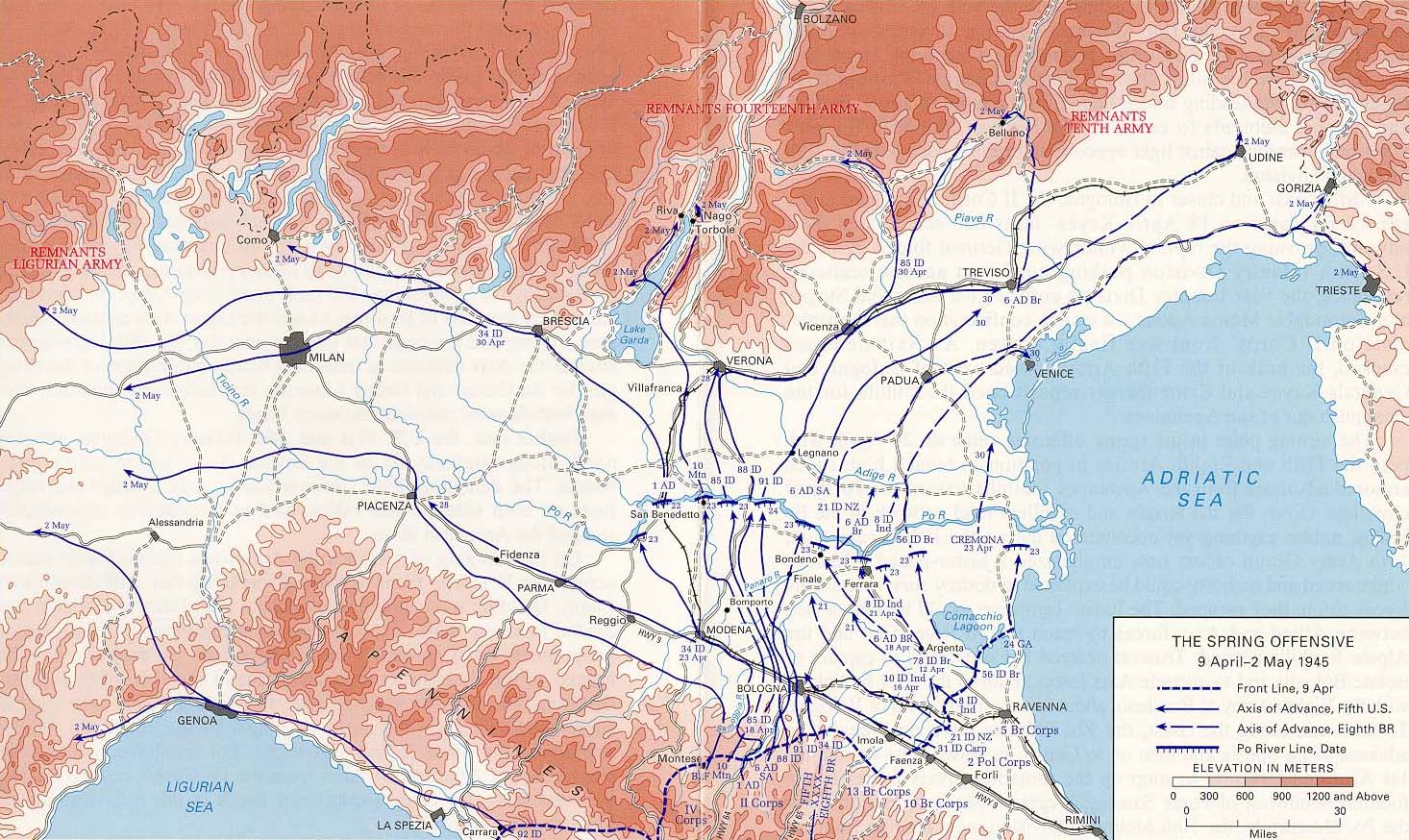
Spring Offensive, Italy 1945

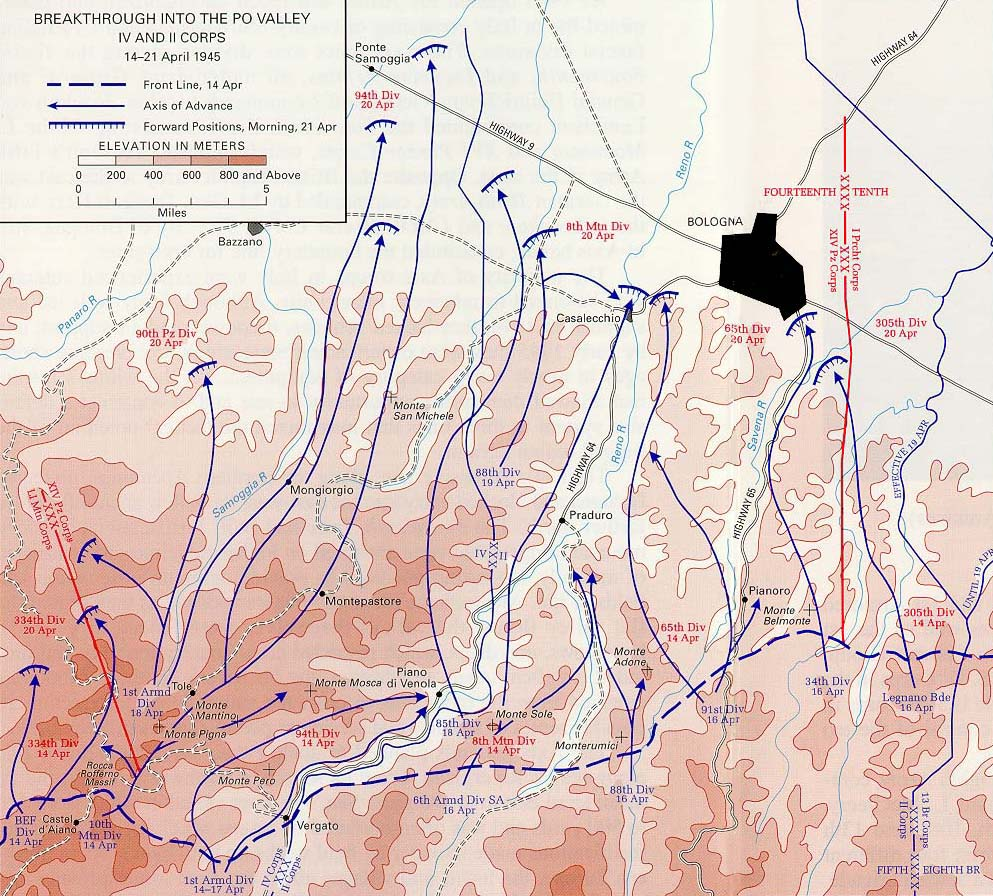
IV Corps operations, Italy April 1945
Operations Report by the 337th Infantry Regiment for January through April 1944

Operations Report by the 337th Infantry Regiment for May 1944

1st Battalion's operations report for May 1944

Operations Report by the 337th Infantry Regiment for June and July 1944

Operations Report by the 337th Infantry Regiment for August 1944

Operations Report by the 337th Infantry Regiment for September 1944

Operations Report by the 337th Infantry Regiment for October 1944

Operations Report by the 337th Infantry Regiment for December 1944

Operations Report by the 337th Infantry Regiment for January 1945

Operations Report by the 337th Infantry Regiment for February 1945

Operations Report by the 337th Infantry Regiment for March 1945

Operations Report by the 337th Infantry Regiment for April 1945

=== Post War Service ===
The Regiment was reconstituted on 6 November 1946 in the Organized Reserves with headquarters in the Minneapolis, Minnesota, under TOE 29-7T. Its recruiting area was Illinois, Minnesota, South Dakota, and North Dakota. On 31 December 1949 the Regimental Headquarters was moved to Chicago, Illinois and then to Waukegan, Illinois, on 1 August 1955. The regiment, and its parent 85th Infantry Division belonged to the Fifth Army, headquartered in Chicago. The 1948 organization of the regiment called for a strength of 3,774 officers and enlisted men organized as below:

- Headquarters & Headquarters Company- 289
  - Service Company- 186
  - Tank Company- 148
  - Heavy Mortar Company- 190
  - Medical Company- 214
- Infantry Battalion (x3)
  - Headquarters & Headquarters Company- 119
  - Rifle Company (x3)- 211
  - Weapons Company- 165

=== Under the 85th Training Division ===
The 337th Infantry was redesignated as the 337th Regiment (Basic Combat Training), and reorganized to consist of the 1st, 2d, and 3d Battalions, elements of the 85th Division (Training Support) on 1 June 1959. On 31 January 1968, the Regimental Headquarters and the 3rd Battalion were inactivated. On 1 May 1971, the 3rd Battalion was reactivated and all three Battalions were redesigned as Advanced Individual Training units. 1st Battalion was inactivated on 13 January 1995 with personnel transferred to the 2nd and 3rd Battalions. The 1st Battalion was reactivated and allotted to the Regular Army on 17 October 1999 and assigned to the 166th Aviation Brigade at Fort Hood, Texas, with a mission to train Aviation units.

=== Transformation of the Army ===
All Battalions are currently subordinate to the First Army and wear the First Army Shoulder Sleeve Insignia. The 1st Battalion was assigned to the 166th Aviation Brigade and specialized in training Aviation units at Fort Hood, Texas, until it was reassigned to Fort McCoy in 2015. The 1st Battalion was responsible for training an Alaska Army National Guard aviation unit for deployment in 2010, elements of the 5th Battalion, 159th Aviation Regiment for a deployment to Iraq, as well as several units for deployment to Kosovo as part of the KFOR in 2014. The 2nd Battalion was assigned to the 205th Infantry Brigade with a mission to train Combat Support and Combat Service Support units.

=== Current Assignment ===
As part of Operation Bold Shift, the battalion changed their missions to better train Army Reserve and National Guard units.

The 1st Battalion is a Regular Army unit assigned to the 181st Infantry Brigade at Fort McCoy, Wisconsin, with a mission to train Brigade Support Battalions, Combat Sustainment Support Battalions, and other logistics units. The Battalion frequently sends personnel to NTC and JRTC to train units conducting rotations.

The 2nd Battalion is an Army Reserve unit assigned to the 157th Infantry Brigade with a mission to train Combat Support and Combat Service Support units.

The 3rd Battalion is an Army Reserve unit assigned to the 4th Cavalry Brigade at Fort Knox, Kentucky and provides Observer, Controller/ Trainers (OC/T) and Staff to various Mobilization Training Centers responsible for conducting post mobilization training to Reserve Component units preparing them for deployment to Overseas Contingency Operations.

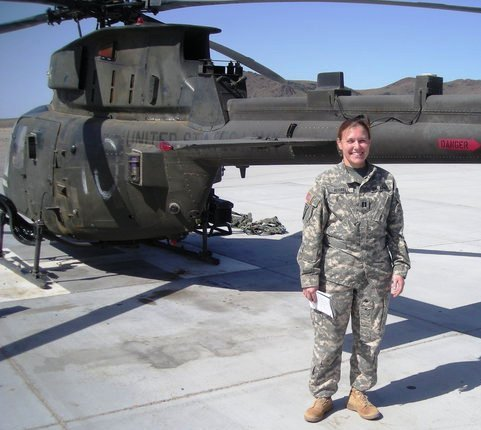
1st Battalion supporting NTC Rotation 10-05

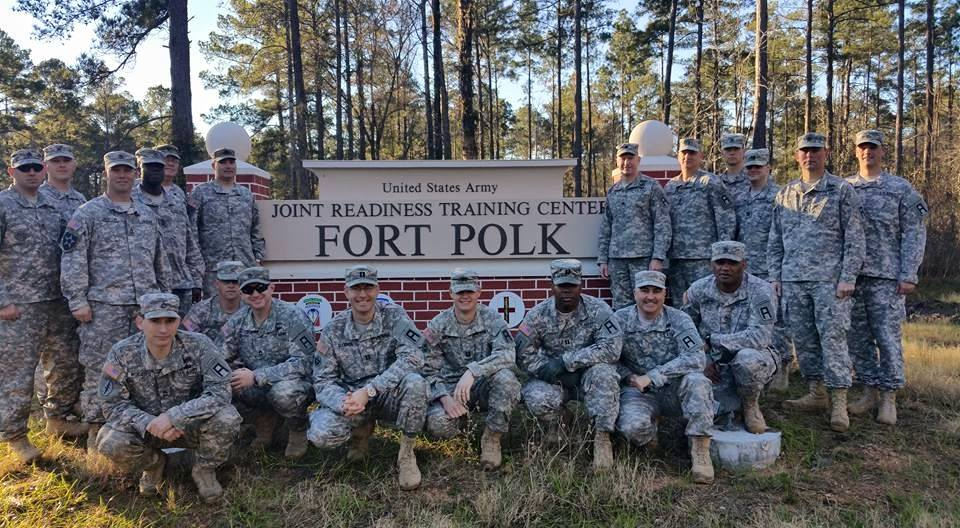
1st Battalion supporting JRTC Rotation 16-03 with 3-340th BEB and 1-291st BSB

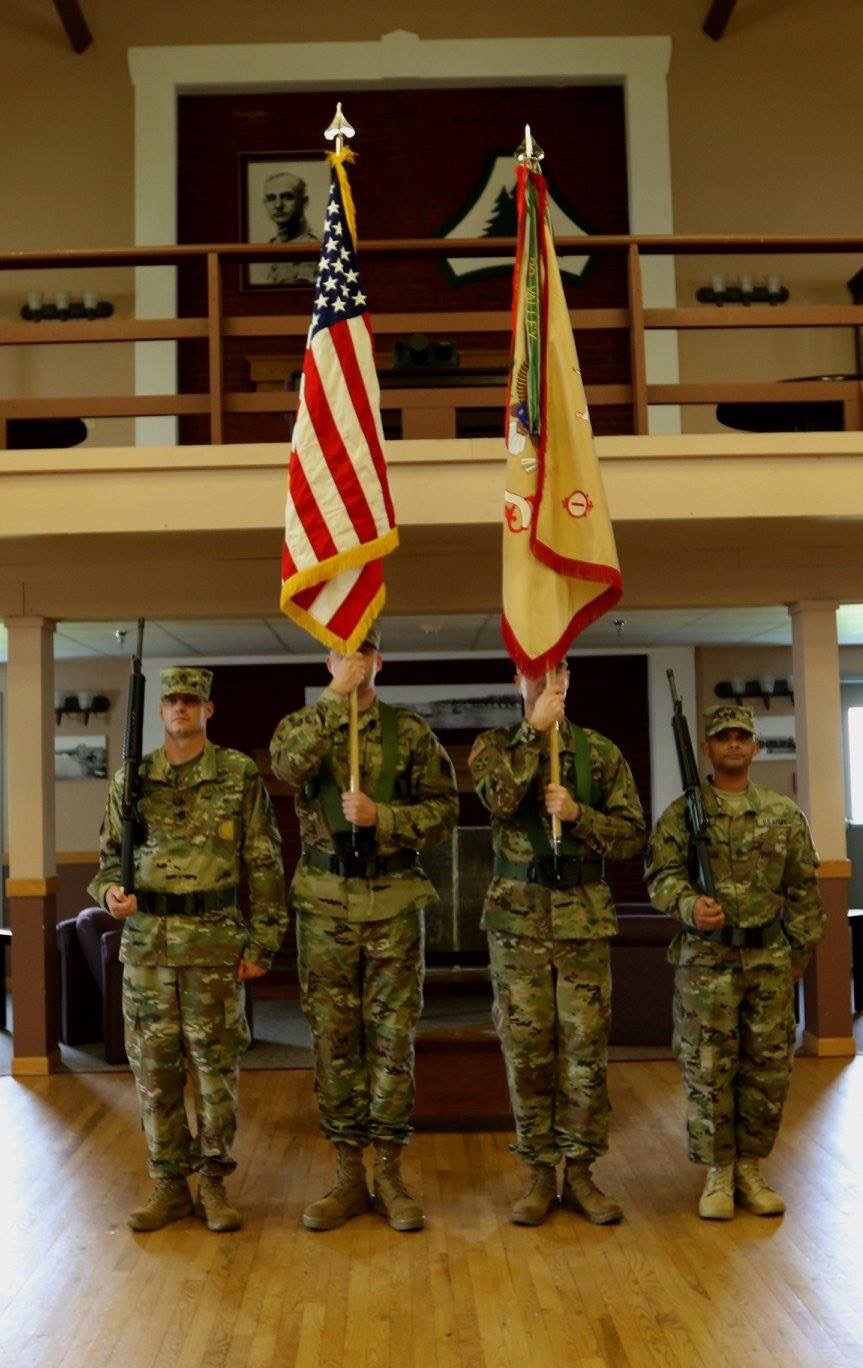
1-337 color guard ready for the battalion reactivation ceremony

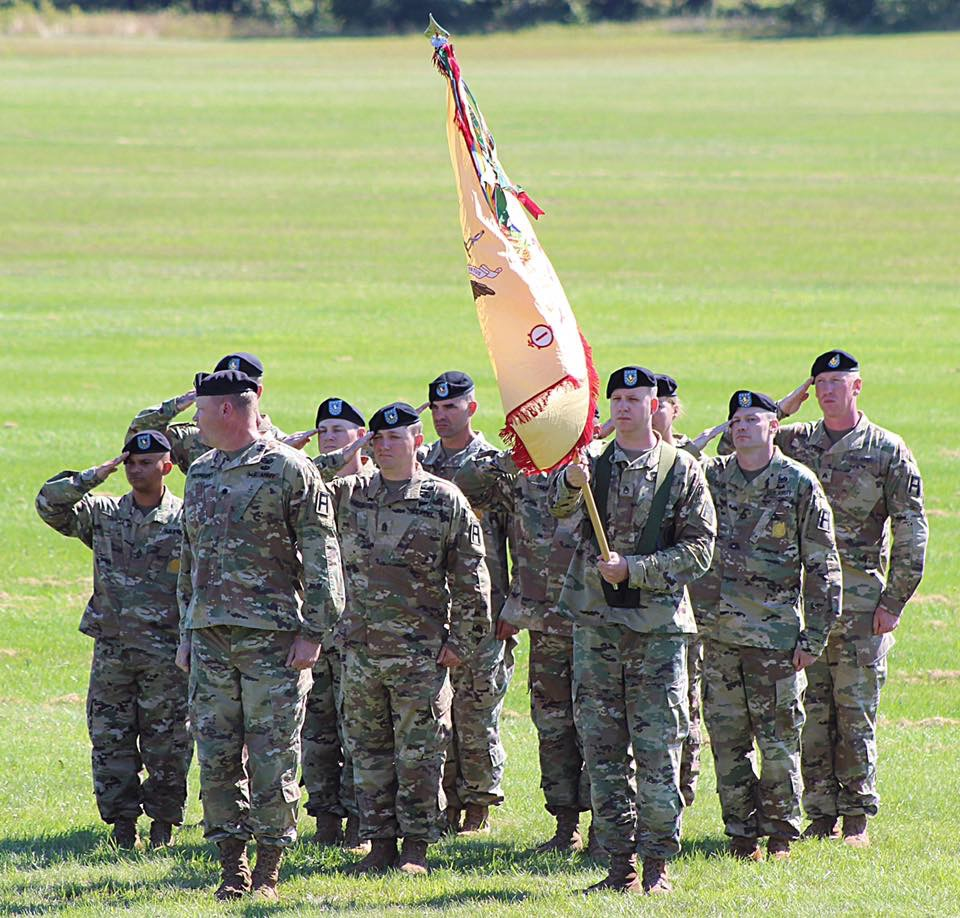
1-337th BSB at 181st Infantry Brigade change of command ceremony July 28, 2017

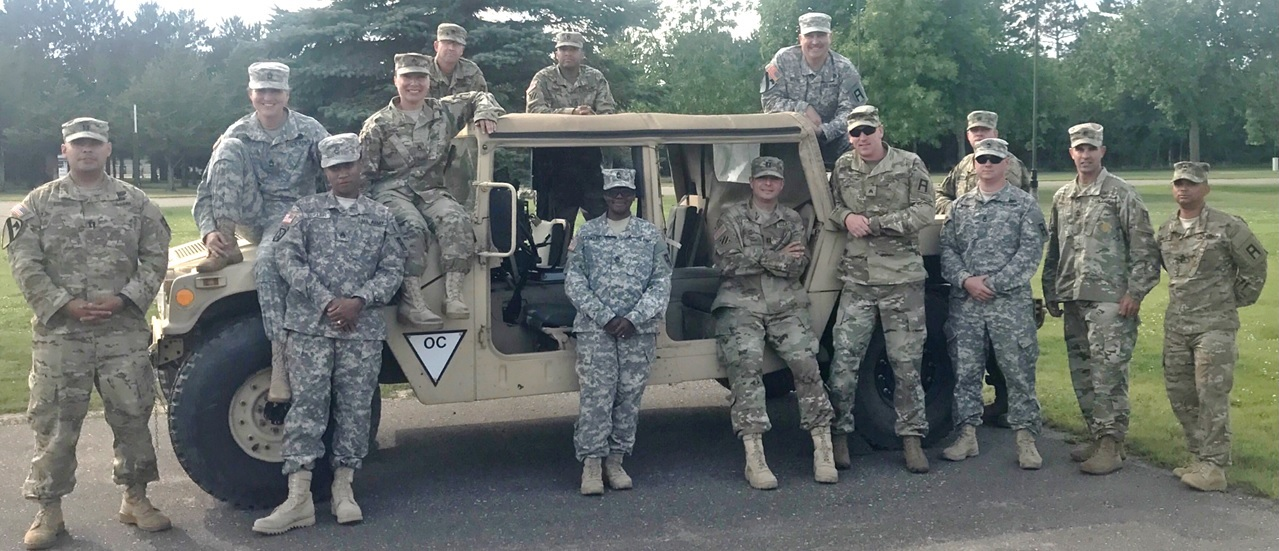
1-337th BSB preparing to conduct Observer/ Controller duties at Camp Ripley during the Combat Support Training Exercise (CSTX) 17-86-03

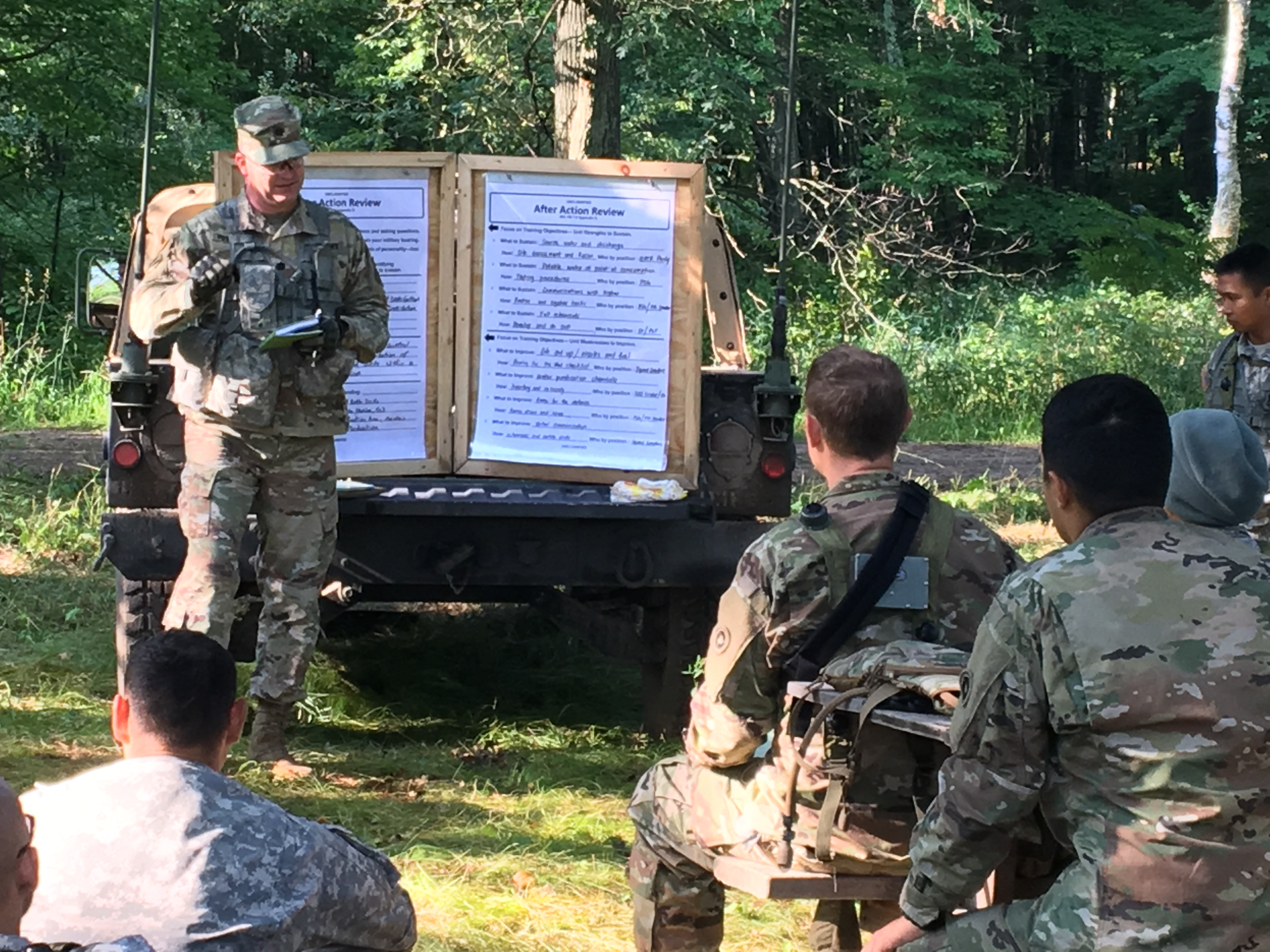
1-337th BSB Observer/Controller-Trainer conducts an After-action review to assist a Reserve unit capture lessons learned from their exercise

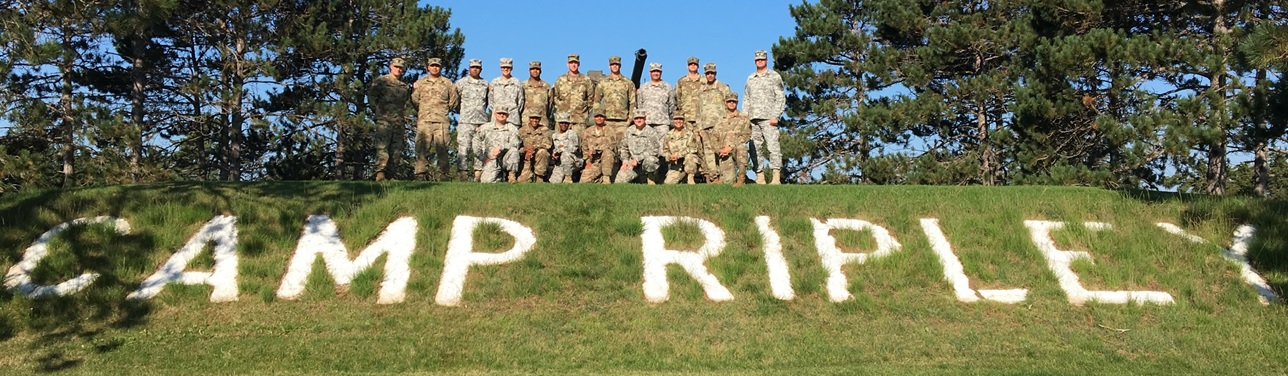
1-337th BSB after conducting Observer/Controller duties at Camp Ripley for CSTX 17-86-03

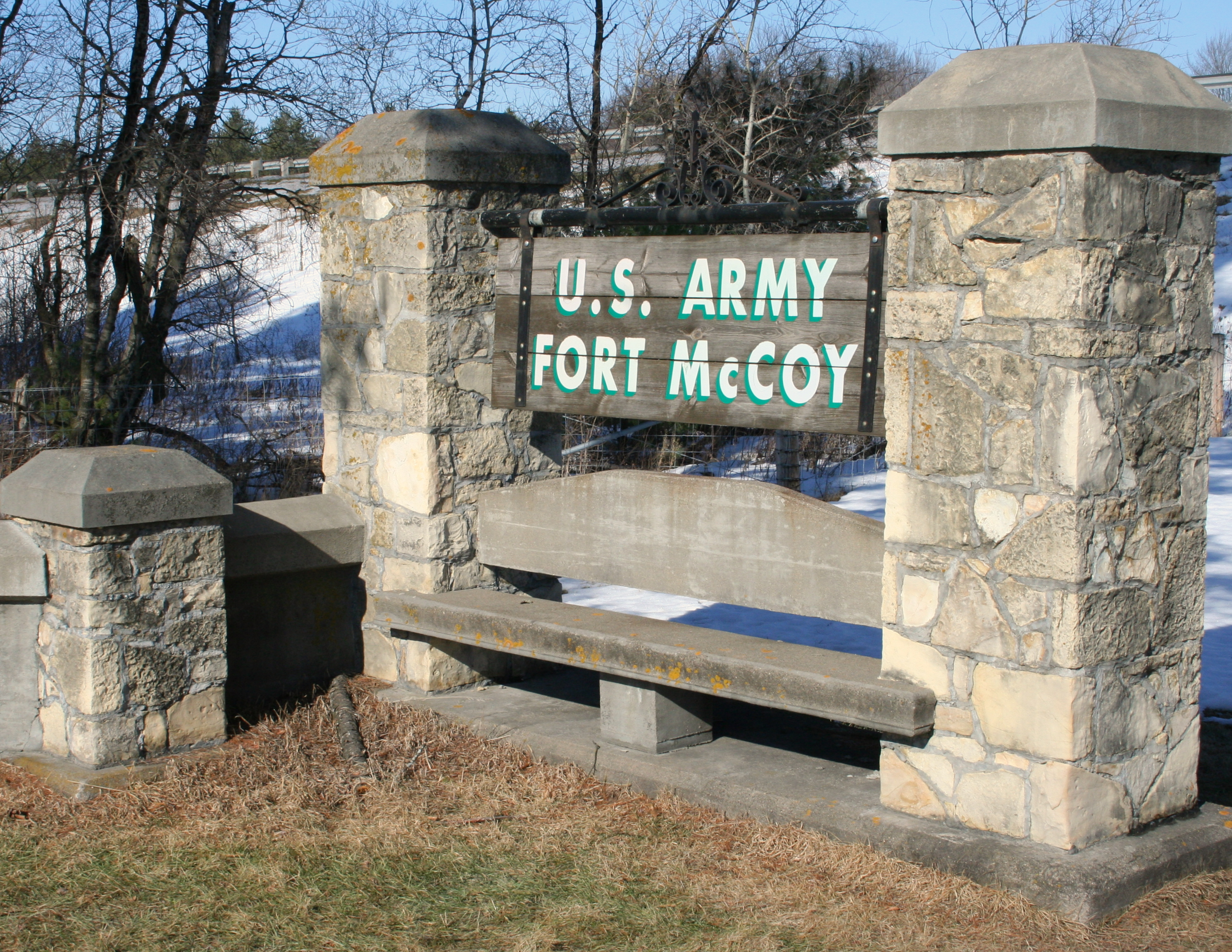
Fort McCoy, Wisconsin

== Campaign streamers ==
Conflict	Streamer	Year(s)
World War I	No Inscription	
World War II	Rome-Arno	1944
World War II	North Apennines	1944-1945
World War II	Po Valley	1945

Document	Dated	Certificate
Previous Lineage and Honors	1960	Regimental Lineage and Honors Certificate detailing significant events and honors for the unit. Generated by the United States Center of Military History.
Current Lineage and Honors	2002	Regimental Lineage and Honors Certificate detailing significant events and honors for the unit. Generated by the United States Center of Military History.

== Decorations ==
Ribbon	Award	Year	Subordinate Elements	Embroidered	Notes
	Presidential Unit Citation	12-16 May 1944	Company C, 1st Battalion	Tremensuoli	General Orders #81, 14 October 1944
	Presidential Unit Citation	1944	Company F, 2nd Battalion	Mount Monzano	September 1944
	Army Meritorious Unit Commendation	Afghanistan Retrograde 2021-2022	1st Battalion	2021-2022	Permanent Orders 032-0001 announcing award of the Army Meritorious Unit Commendation
	Army Superior Unit Award	2004-2006	2nd Battalion	2004-2006	Permanent Order 202-27, 21 July 2009 & General Order 2013-16
	Army Superior Unit Award	2008-2011	Entire Regiment	2008-2011	Permanent Orders 332-07 announcing award of the Army Superior Unit award
None	Secretary of the Army; Superior Unit Certificate	1960-1961	Regimental Headquarters; Companies A and D of 1st Battalion; Headquarters Company of 2nd Battalion, Companies E and H of 2nd Battalion; Companies I and M of 3rd Battalion	None	Department of the Army General Orders 15, 1962
None	Secretary of the Army; Superior Unit Certificate	1961-1962	Regimental Headquarters; Headquarters Company, 1st Battalion; Headquarters Company, 2nd Battalion; Company K, 3rd Battalion	None	DA GO 14, 20 March 1963
None	Secretary of the Army; Superior Unit Certificate	1965-1966	Regimental Headquarters; Headquarters Company, 1st Battalion	None	Department of the Army General Orders 24, 1966

== Shoulder sleeve insignia ==

- Description: On a background equally divided horizontally white and red, 3 1/4 inches (83 mm) high and 2 1/2 inches (64 mm) wide at base and 2 1/8 inches (54 mm) wide at top, a black block letter "A", 2 3/4 inches (70 mm) high, 2 inches (51 mm) wide at base and 1 5/8 inches (41 mm) wide at top, all members 7/16 inch (11 mm) wide, all enclosed within a 1/8 inch (3.2 mm) Army Green border.
- Symbolism:
1. The red and white of the background are the colors used in flags for Armies.
2. The letter "A" represents "Army" and is also the first letter of the alphabet suggesting "First Army."
- Background:
1. A black letter "A" was approved as the authorized insignia by the Commanding General, American Expeditionary Force, on 16 November 1918 and approved by the War Department on 5 May 1922.
2. The background was added on 17 November 1950.

== Distinctive unit insignia ==
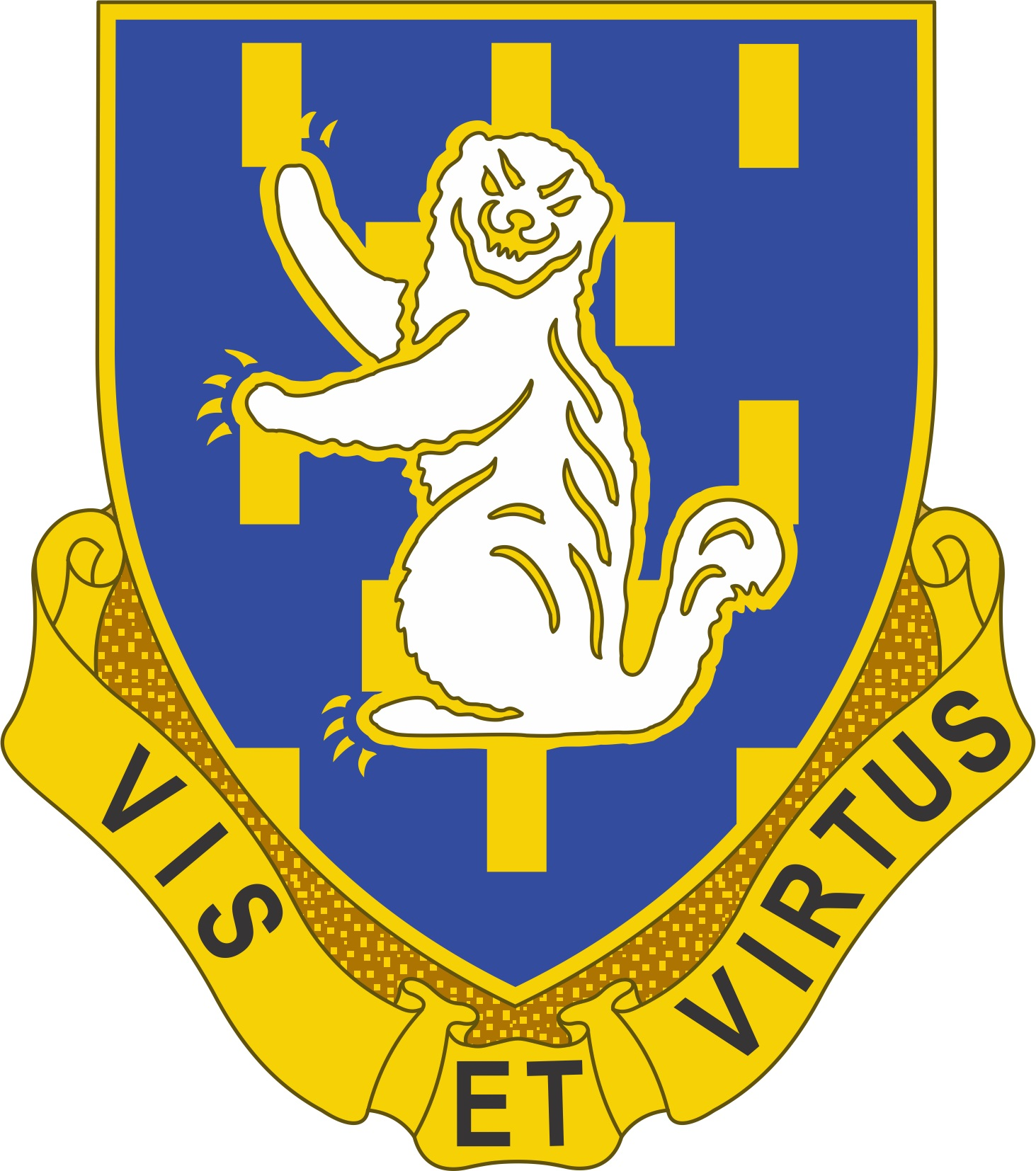

- Description/Blazon A Gold color metal and enamel device 1 5/32 inches (29 mm) in height overall consisting of a shield blazoned: Azure, billette Or, a wolverine sejant guardant erect Argent. Attached below and to the sides of the shield a Gold scroll inscribed "VIS ET VIRTUS" in Black letters.
- Symbolism The shield is blue for Infantry. The gold billettes are taken from the arms of Nevers, the capital of the Department of Nièvre, Cosne, the first locations where the regiment was billeted in the War Zone, being in the Department of Nievre. The wolverine represents Michigan, the location of the 337th Infantry in 1921. The motto translates to "Strength and Courage."
- Background The distinctive unit insignia was originally approved for the 337th Infantry Regiment on 16 June 1926. It was redesignated for the 337th Regiment on 8 August 1960

== Coat of arms ==
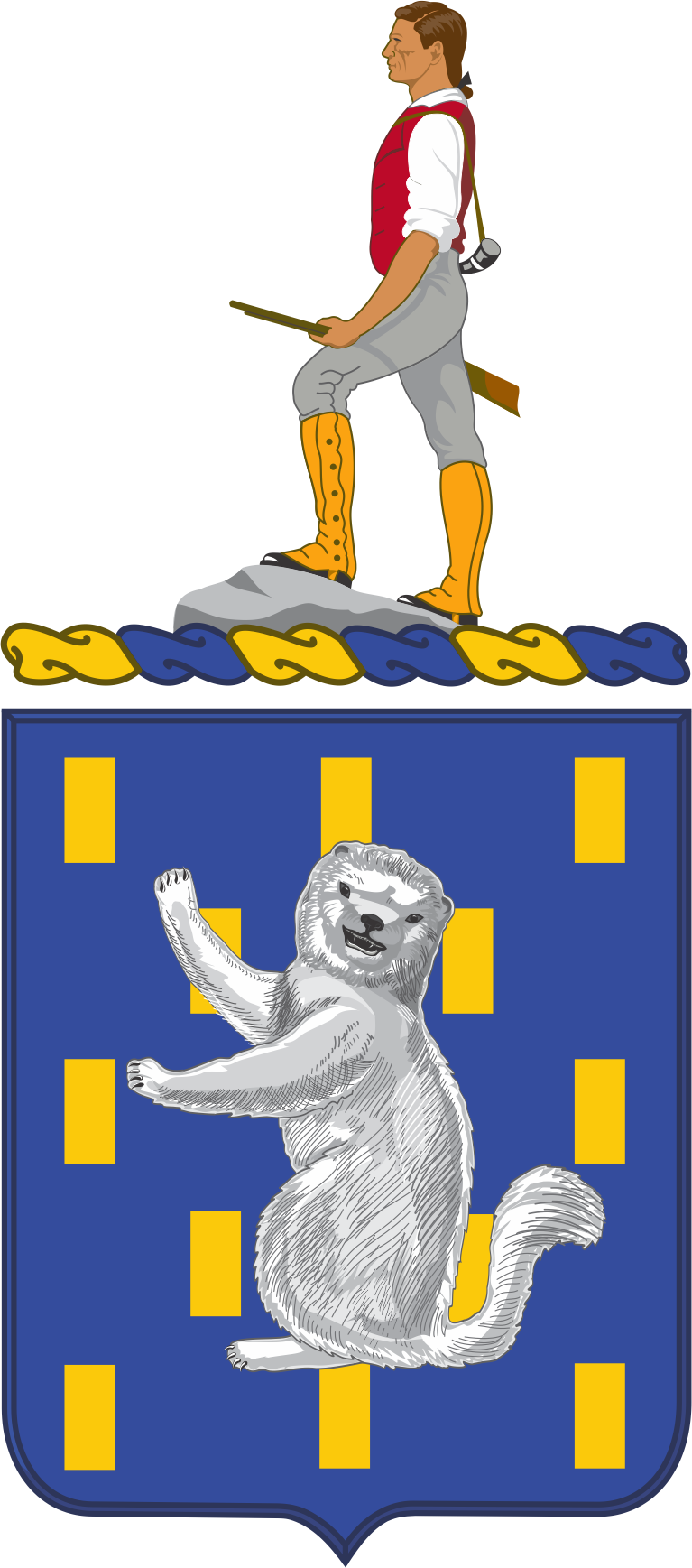

- Description/Blazon
  - Shield: Azure, billette Or, a wolverine sejant guardant erect Argent.
  - Crest: That for the regiments and separate battalions of the Army Reserve: On a wreath of the colors Argent and Azure, the Lexington Minute Man Proper. The statue of the Minute Man, Captain John Parker (H.H. Kitson, sculptor), stands on the Common in Lexington, Massachusetts.
  - Motto: VIS ET VIRTUS (Strength and Courage).
- Symbolism
  - Shield: The shield is blue for Infantry. The gold billettes are taken from the arms of Nevers, the capital of the Department of Nievre, Cosne, the first locations where the regiment was billeted in the War Zone, being in the Department of Nievre. The wolverine represents Michigan, the location of the 337th Infantry in 1921.
  - Crest: The crest is that of the United States Army Reserve.
  - Background : The coat of arms was originally approved for the 337th Infantry Regiment on 15 June 1926. It was redesignated for the 337th Regiment on 8 August 1960.
U.S. Army Institute of Heraldry assignment of insignias to the 337th Infantry Regiment, circa 1960
Designation of heraldry for the 337th Infantry Regiment distinctive symbols

Coat of arms specification

Distinctive unit insignia specification
