= 291st Regiment =

291st Regiment may refer to:

- 291st Infantry Regiment, United States
- 291st (4th London) Airborne Field Regiment, Royal Artillery
