= 166th Brigade =

166th Brigade may refer to:

== United Kingdom ==
- 166th (South Lancashire) Brigade
- 166th (Camberwell) Brigade, Royal Field Artillery

== United States ==
- 166th Aviation Brigade

== See also ==
- 166th Regiment (disambiguation)
