= 479th =

479th may refer to:

- 479th Antisubmarine Group, inactive United States Air Force unit
- 479th Bombardment Squadron, inactive United States Air Force unit
- 479th Field Artillery Brigade (United States), field artillery brigade of the United States Army
- 479th Flying Training Group, United States Air Force unit, stationed at Naval Air Station Pensacola (NASP)
- 479th Tactical Training Wing, inactive United States Air Force unit

== See also ==
- 479 (number)
- 479, the year 479 (CDLXXIX) of the Julian calendar
- 479 BC
