= 291st Infantry Regiment =

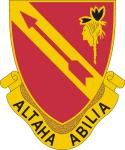
- Regimental Distinctive Unit Insignia
- Active: 1942–1945; 1952–present
- Country: USA
- Branch: U.S. Army
- Role: Infantry
- Size: Regiment
- Part of: First Army
- Motto: "Altaha Abilia" (Always Ready)
- Anniversaries: Constituted 24 December 1942 in the National Army
- Decorations: Army Superior Unit Award
- Battle honours: World War II

The 291st Infantry Regiment was a National Army Infantry Regiment first organized for service in World War II as part of the 75th Infantry Division in Europe. Since 1952 it has served as a training Regiment, both in the Reserve Component and Active Component.

== Service history ==
=== World War II ===
The regiment was ordered into active military service 15 April 1943 and reorganized at Fort Leonard Wood, Missouri. The regiment participated in the Louisiana Maneuvers in January 1944. The regiment departed Camp Shanks on 22 October 1944 through the New York Port of Embarkation. The regiment fought across France and Germany, entering Germany on 10 March 1945. In July 1943, the regiment was organized with 3,256 officers and enlisted men:

- Headquarters & Headquarters Company- 111
  - Service Company- 114
  - Anti-Tank Company- 165
  - Cannon Company- 118
  - Medical Detachment- 135
- Infantry Battalion (x3)- 871
  - Headquarters & Headquarters Company- 126
  - Rifle Company (x3)- 193
  - Weapons Company- 156

=== Returning Home ===
The regiment departed France and arrived at Camp Patrick Henry and the Hampton Roads Port of Embarkation on 23 November 1945, and inactivated on the same date.

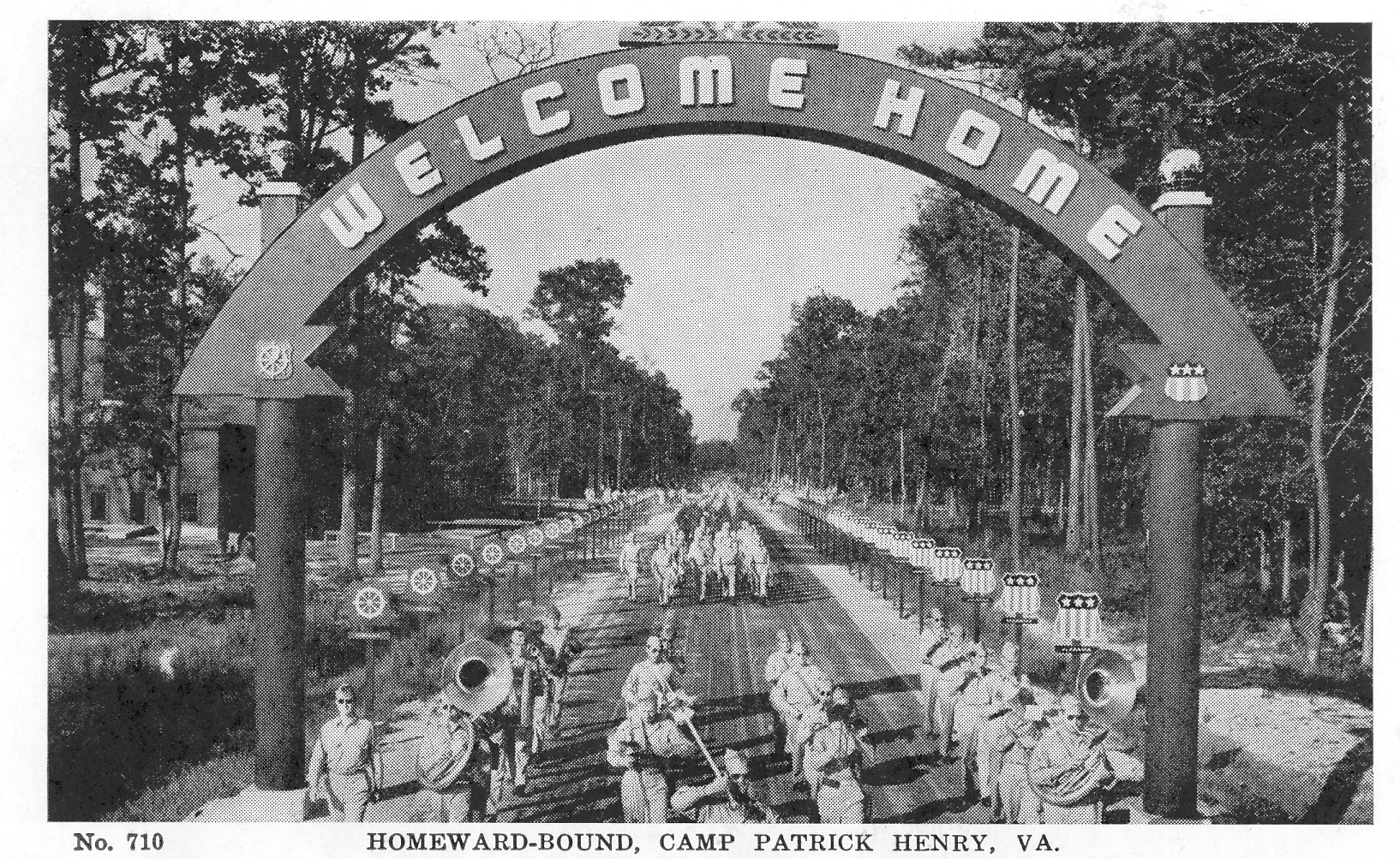
Welcome Home, Camp Patrick Henry

== Post War Service ==
From 1 March 1952, until 15 April 1997, the regiment served as a training unit under the 95th Training Division working with other units of the Army Reserve.

=== Current Assignment ===
The 1st Battalion is a Regular Army unit assigned to the 181st Infantry Brigade at Fort McCoy, Wisconsin with a mission to train Brigade Support Battalions.

The 2nd Battalion is a Regular Army unit assigned to the 166th Aviation Brigade at Fort Hood, Texas with a mission to train Aviation Battalions.

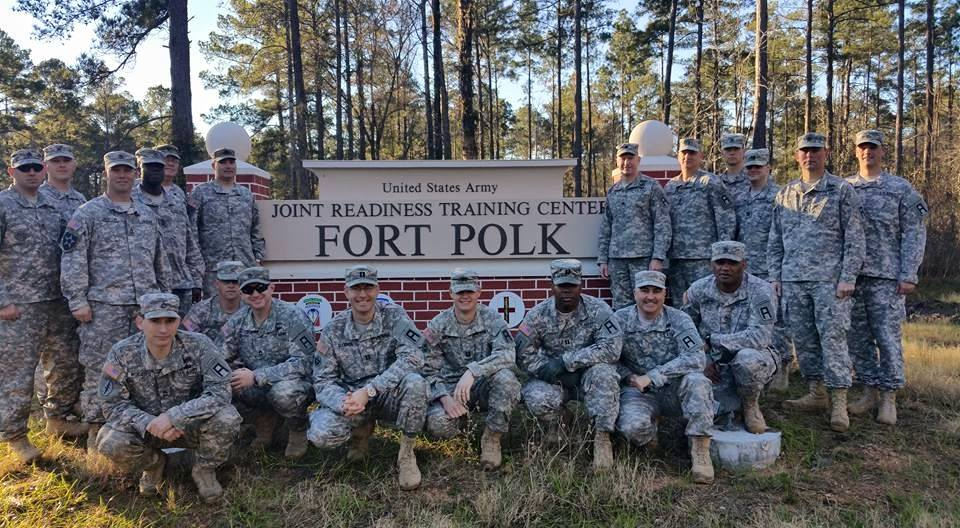
1st Battalion supporting JRTC Rotation 16–03 with 3-340th BEB and 1-337th BSB

== Campaign streamers ==
Conflict	Streamer	Year(s)
World War II	Rhineland	1944-1945
World War II	Ardennes-Alsace	1944-1945
World War II	Central Europe	1945

== Decorations ==
Ribbon	Award	Year	Unit	Orders
	Meritorious Unit Commendation	2021-2022	1st Battalion	Permanent Orders 032-0001 announcing award of the Meritorious Unit Commendation
	Army Superior Unit Award	2008-2011	1st Battalion	Permanent Orders 332-07 announcing award of the Army Superior Unit award
None	Secretary of the Army Superior Unit Certificate	1961-1962	B Company, 1st Battalion	DA GO 15, 9 April 1962
None	Secretary of the Army Superior Unit Certificate	1962-1963	M Company, 3rd Battalion	DA GO 14, 20 March 1963

== Shoulder sleeve insignia ==

- Description: On a background equally divided horizontally white and red, 3 1/4 inches (83 mm) high and 2 1/2 inches (64 mm) wide at the base and 2 1/8 inches (54 mm) wide at top, a black block letter "A", 2 3/4 inches (70 mm) high, 2 inches (51 mm) wide at the base and 1 5/8 inches (41 mm) wide at top, all members 7/16 inch (11 mm) wide, all enclosed within a 1/8 inch (3.2 mm) Army Green border.
- Symbolism:
1. The red and white of the background are the colors used in flags for Armies.
2. The letter "A" represents "Army" and is also the first letter of the alphabet suggesting "First Army."
- Background:
1. A black letter "A" was approved as the authorized insignia by the Commanding General, American Expeditionary Force, on 16 November 1918 and approved by the War Department on 5 May 1922.
2. The background was added on 17 November 1950.

== Distinctive unit insignia ==
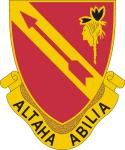

- Description/Blazon A Gold color metal and enamel device 1 5/32 inches (29 mm) in height overall consisting of a shield blazoned: Gules, on a bend Or an arrow of the field, in sinister chief the head of a Native American warrior of the second dressed with five feathers in scalp lock Sable fimbriated Yellow. Attached below the shield a Gold scroll inscribed "ALTAHA ABILIA" in Black letters.
- Symbolism The five feathers on the Native American's head represent the five Indian tribes of the State of Oklahoma, the state in which the regiment has traditionally been associated. These tribes are Cherokee, Choctaw, Chickasaw, Creeks, and Seminoles. The red arrow is symbolic of the regiment always pointing forward and underlies the unit's motto of "Always Ready." The red background of the shield reflects valor.
- Background The distinctive unit insignia was approved on 1 October 1999.

== Coat of arms ==
- Description/Blazon
  - Shield: Gules, on a bend Or an arrow of the field, in sinister chief the head of Native American warrior of the second dressed with five feathers in scalp lock Sable fimbriated Yellow.
  - Crest: That for regiments and separate battalions of the Army Reserve: From a wreath Or and Gules, the Lexington Minute Man Proper. The statue of the Minute Man, Captain John Parker (H.H. Kitson, sculptor), stands on the common in Lexington, Massachusetts.
  - Motto: ALTAHA ABILIA (Always Ready).
  - Shield: The five feathers on the Native American's head represent the five Indian tribes of the State of Oklahoma, the state in which the regiment has traditionally been associated. These tribes are Cherokee, Choctaw, Chickasaw, Creeks and Seminoles. The red arrow is symbolic of the regiment always pointing forward and underlies the unit's motto of "Always Ready." The red background of the shield reflects valor.
  - Crest: The crest is that of the U.S. Army Reserve.
  - Background: The coat of arms was approved on 1 October 1999
