= Chris Carr (Medal of Honor) =

United States Army soldier

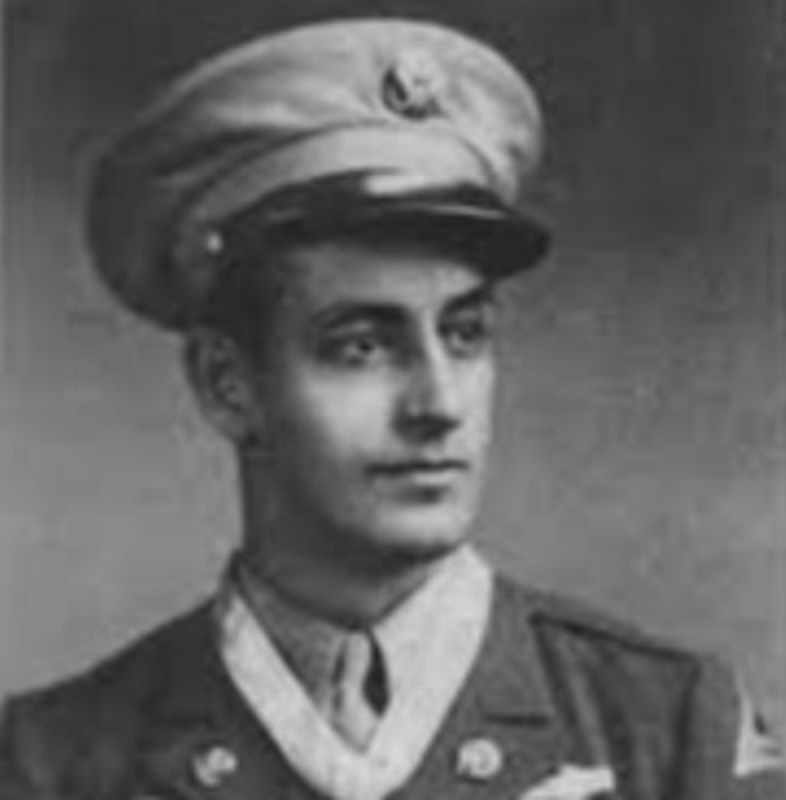
- Born: Christos H. Karaberis; April 6, 1914; Manchester, New Hampshire, US
- Died: September 16, 1970 (aged 56); Huntington Beach, California, US
- Burial place: Los Angeles National Cemetery, Los Angeles, California
- Military career
- Allegiance: United States
- Branch: United States Army
- Service years: 1942–1953
- Rank: Sergeant First Class
- Units: 337th Infantry Regiment, 85th Infantry Division
- Conflicts: World War II; Korean War
- Awards: Medal of Honor

Chris Carr (born Christos H. Karaberis, April 6, 1914 – September 16, 1970) was a United States Army soldier and a recipient of the United States military's highest decoration—the Medal of Honor—for his actions in World War II.

== Biography ==
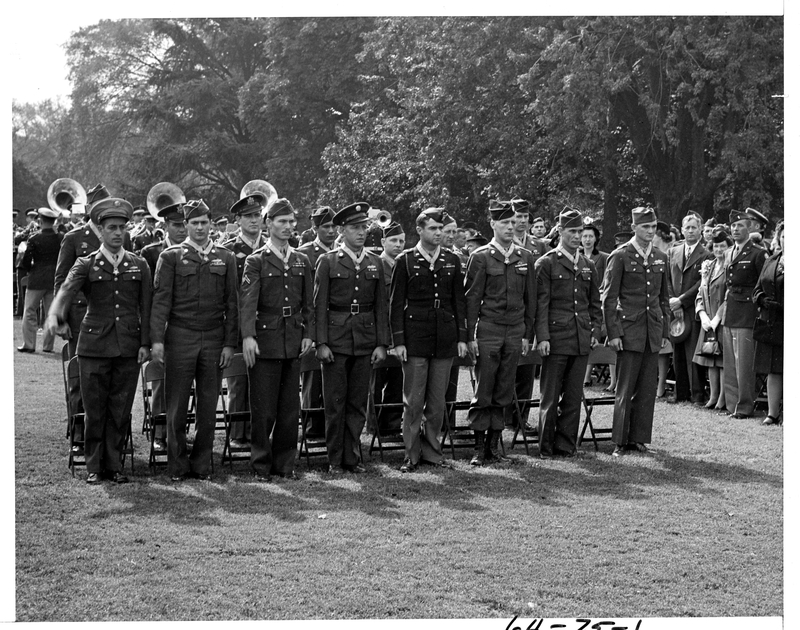
Carr (front row, furthest to the left) was one of 15 members of the U.S. Army who received the Medal of Honor from President Harry S. Truman at the White House on October 12, 1945.

Carr, a first-generation Greek American, was born Christos H. Karaberis in Manchester, New Hampshire. He joined the Army from his hometown in October 1942 and by October 1, 1944, was serving as a sergeant in Company L, 337th Infantry Regiment, 85th Infantry Division. On that day and the following day, near Giugnola, Italy, he single-handedly attacked and captured five German machine gun emplacements. For these actions, he was awarded the Medal of Honor a year later on November 1, 1945.

Carr had three brothers who also served in the war. Constantine Karaberis, the eldest, was a United States Naval Academy graduate who was serving on the USS Saratoga at the time of the attack on Pearl Harbor. He continued to serve into the Cold War period, retiring as a rear admiral. Nicholas (Nick) Karaberis was also in the Navy, and landed at Utah Beach on D-Day. Telemachus (Ted) was an Army infantryman who fought in the Ruhr pocket.

After the war, he legally changed his name from "Christos Karaberis" to "Chris Carr". He reached the rank of sergeant first class and served in the Korean War before leaving the Army. Carr died at age 56 and was buried in Los Angeles National Cemetery, Los Angeles, California.

== Awards and decorations ==
=== Medal of Honor ===
Carr's official Medal of Honor citation reads:

Citation

Leading a squad of Company L, he gallantly cleared the way for his company's approach along a ridge toward its objective, the Casoni di Romagna. When his platoon was pinned down by heavy fire from enemy mortars, machineguns, machine pistols, and rifles, he climbed in advance of his squad on a maneuver around the left flank to locate and eliminate the enemy gun positions. Undeterred by deadly fire that ricocheted off the barren rocky hillside, he crept to the rear of the first machinegun and charged, firing his submachinegun. In this surprise attack he captured 8 prisoners and turned them over to his squad before striking out alone for a second machinegun. Discovered in his advance and subjected to direct fire from the hostile weapon, he leaped to his feet and ran forward, weaving and crouching, pouring automatic fire into the emplacement that killed 4 of its defenders and forced the surrender of a lone survivor. He again moved forward through heavy fire to attack a third machinegun. When close to the emplacement, he closed with a nerve-shattering shout and burst of fire. Paralyzed by his whirlwind attack, all 4 gunners immediately surrendered. Once more advancing aggressively in the face of a thoroughly alerted enemy, he approached a point of high ground occupied by 2 machineguns which were firing on his company on the slope below. Charging the first of these weapons, he killed 4 of the crew and captured 3 more. The 6 defenders of the adjacent position, cowed by the savagery of his assault, immediately gave up. By his l-man attack, heroically and voluntarily undertaken in the face of tremendous risks, Sgt. Karaberis captured 5 enemy machinegun positions, killed 8 Germans, took 22 prisoners, cleared the ridge leading to his company's objective, and drove a deep wedge into the enemy line, making it possible for his battalion to occupy important, commanding ground.

=== Commendations ===
Carr's awards include the following:

== See also ==
- List of Medal of Honor recipients for World War II
