= 166th Aviation Brigade =

- Shoulder sleeve insignia of First Army, worn by the 166th Aviation Brigade
- Active: 1990-09-16 – 1997-07-15; 1997-10-24 – 1999-10-16; 2006-12-01 – 2015-06-24; 2018-08-17 – Present
- Country: United States
- Allegiance: United States Army
- Branch: United States Army Reserve
- Type: Aviation brigade
- Role: Training
- Size: Brigade
- Part of: Division West, First Army
- Garrison/HQ: Fort Hood, Texas
- Motto: Wings in the West
- Decorations: Army Superior Unit Award
- Battle honours: None

Commanders
- Current commander: COL Darryl Von Hagel

Insignia
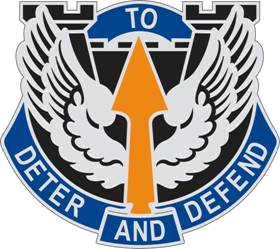
- Distinctive unit insignia

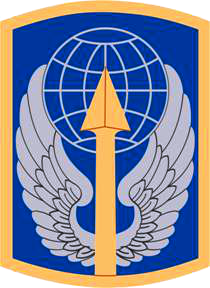
- Designated but not authorized shoulder sleeve insignia of the 166th Aviation Brigade

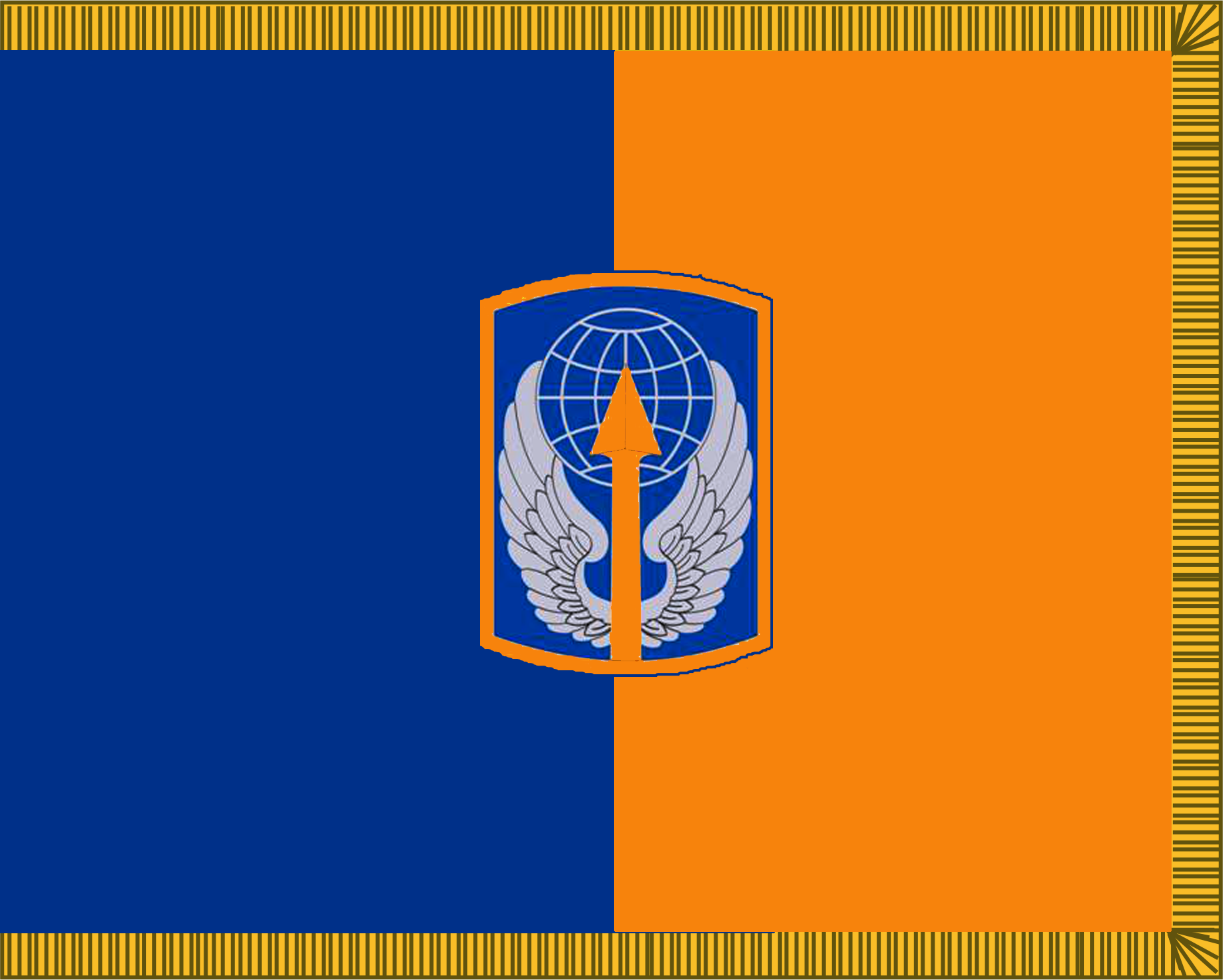
- 166th Aviation Brigade Flag

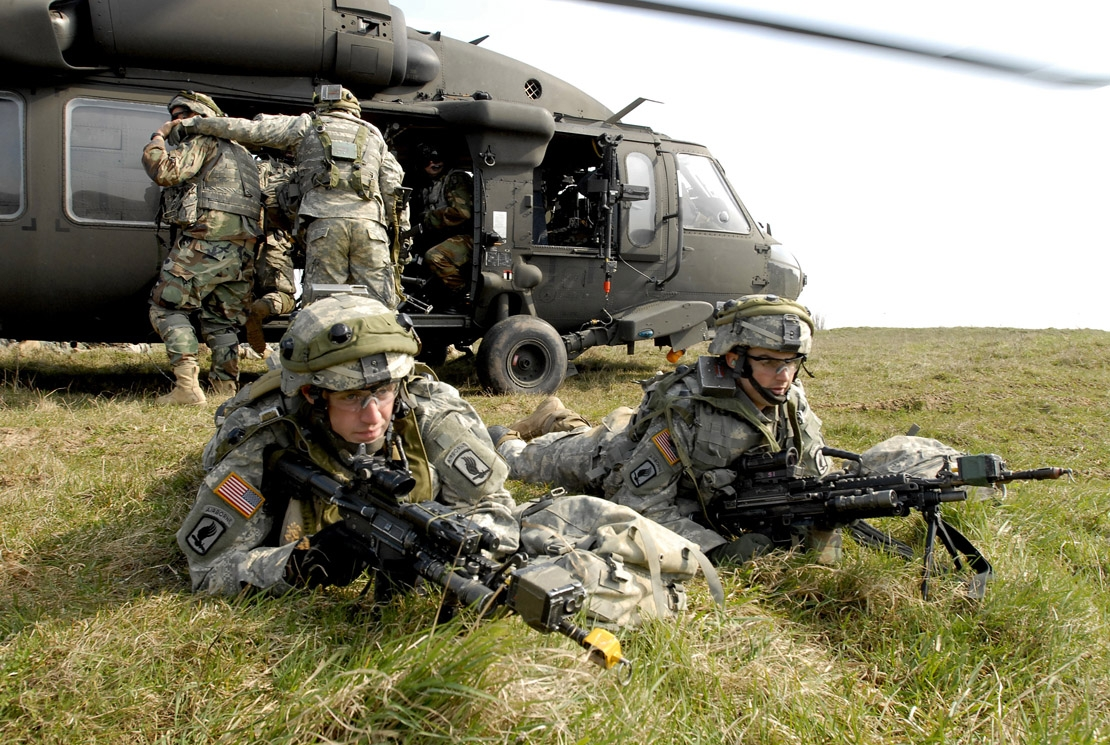
Air assault, one of the operations that the 166th Aviation Brigade trains pilots for

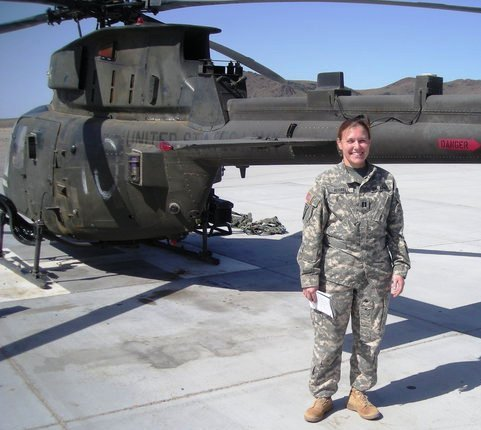
1-337 supporting NTC Rotation 10-05

The 166th Aviation Brigade is an aviation training brigade of the United States Army headquartered at Fort Hood, Texas.It is a subordinate unit of First Army . An "AC/RC" (Active Component / Reserve Component) formation, the 166th Aviation Brigade was the sole organization responsible for the post-mobilization training of United States Army Reserve & National Guard aviation units. The unit was formerly designated as 3rd Brigade, 75th Division.

From 1997, the 166th Aviation Brigade has trained other aviation units for front-line service. As such, it has never seen combat, and has thus never earned any campaign streamers or unit awards. As the only brigade in the First Army responsible for training aviation units, the 166th Aviation Brigade is the principal unit for training Army Reserve and Army National Guard assets preparing to deploy to contingencies around the world, which means it is responsible for 47 percent of all Army Aviation assets.

The 166th Aviation Brigade partnered with its First Army – Division West sister brigade, the 479th Field Artillery Brigade for its combat aviation brigade (CAB) mobilizations, but maintained validation authority, or final approval over a CAB's successful completion of mobilization training. The 166th Aviation Brigade inactivated at Fort hood on 24 June 2015. The 166th Aviation Brigade reactivated at Fort Hood on 17 August 2018.

== Organization ==
The 166th Aviation Brigade consisted of from 2006–2015 of eight battalions from five regiments. Its Headquarters and Headquarters Company is located at Fort Hood, its Reserve Component battalions were located at Fort Des Moines, Iowa, Fort Leavenworth, Kansas, Fort Riley, Kansas and Jefferson Barracks, Missouri, and its Active Component battalions were located at Fort Riley, Kansas, Fort Stewart, Georgia, Fort Knox, Kentucky and Fort Hood, Texas. The 1st Battalion, 291st Aviation Regiment was the brigade's primary attack helicopter training unit, specializing in fast-attack helicopters such as the Boeing AH-64 Apache. The 2nd Battalion, 291st Aviation Regiment was the brigade's primary utility, lift, and air ambulance helicopter training unit, specializing in utility helicopters such as the Sikorsky UH-60 Black Hawk and the CH-47 Chinook. The 1st Battalion, 337th Regiment (Training Support) specialized in mobilization and de-mobilization for aviation units. The remaining battalions, including the 1st Battalion, 351st Regiment (Training Support), 3rd Battalion, 382nd Regiment (Logistics Support), and the 1st, 2nd, and 3rd Battalions of the 383rd Regiment (Combat Support/Combat Sustainment Support) specialized in areas of general instruction about other aspects of mobilization, conducting exercises, and logistics management. While its Reserve Component battalions have somewhat maintained their former mission of training National Guard and Army Reserve units in Iowa, Kansas, Nebraska, and Missouri as they did before the brigade reflagged, they have shifted toward supporting the brigade's primary mission – the mobilization of Combat Aviation Brigades (CABs) by either assisting with ground training, or training and evaluating the CABs' aviation support battalions.

=== Current Organization ===
- 166th Aviation Brigade, at Fort Hood (TX)
  - Headquarters and Headquarters Company, at Fort Hood (TX)
  - 2nd Battalion, 291st Regiment (Aviation), at Fort Hood (TX)
  - 3rd Battalion, 351st Regiment (Aviation), at Fort Hood (TX)
  - 302 Squadron, Royal Netherlands Air Force, at Fort Hood (TX)

== History ==
The 166th Aviation Brigade was first constituted 16 September 1988 in the Army Reserve as Headquarters, 166th Aviation Group. It took two years for the formation to be organized and the unit was finally activated on 16 September 1990 in Germany. It received a distinctive unit insignia on 3 April 1991. Its headquarters was at Illesheim.

The formation was inactivated on 15 June 1997 in Germany. Over the next four months, the unit's inactive components were reorganized and redesignated as a brigade sized unit, allowing it to take on a larger support staff that could command more soldiers. This transformation occurred as the brigade was reassigned to the continental United States. It was activated on 24 October 1997 as the 166th Aviation Brigade at Fort Riley, Kansas. It was also activated into the Active duty force.

The brigade began to undertake training support duties for units in the process of mobilization and de-mobilization. It was also tasked to provide support for local authorities in the event of peacetime crises and natural disasters. Soldiers of the brigade also participated in assistance with community projects around the Fort Riley community, including repairing and refurbishing run down properties for shelter house projects as well as disabled veterans. After two years of duty, the brigade was inactivated on 16 October 1999 at Fort Riley, Kansas.

As part of the Army's Transformation Plan, the 3rd Brigade, 75th Division was redesignated as the 166th Aviation Brigade, under the command of Division West of the First Army. Its mission would be to train and mobilize aviation units of the Army's reserve and national guard components. It was to be the only brigade under the First Army that specialized in training for Army aviation units. It was activated 1 December 2006 as a reserve unit at Fort Riley. The brigade became a partner organization of the 1st Infantry Division, which was stationed at Fort Riley and could provide better support than the headquarters of First Army Division West, which was headquartered at Fort Carson, Colorado and maintained units all over the western United States. The brigade received a shoulder sleeve insignia on 13 June 2007, but it has not been authorized for wear due to First Army policy requiring its units to wear its SSI.

In the summer of 2008, the brigade's combat service/combat sustainment support battalions took part in equipment testing and training in Rapid City, South Dakota. It tested the Multifunction Agile Remote Control Robot IV, a route clearance robot, with the assistance of the South Dakota National Guard. The bulk of the brigade spent the summer at Fort Sill, Oklahoma to train aviation assets for deploying units. In June 2008, the brigade trained the aviation assets of the 34th Infantry Division in air combat, air assault, and other tactics related to aviation. For this mission, the brigade was assisted by the 479th Field Artillery Brigade, which handled ground exercises. As part of a new training routine, the brigade trained the 34th Infantry Division's aviation units at Fort Rucker, spending a longer time training the unit because it continued to train the brigade as it mobilized and prepared to deploy. Other units trained with the Division, but none through the entire mobilization process. This process used new and never-before-used facilities to streamline training exercises. Purportedly, it gave the 166th Aviation Brigade much additional time for training, as the streamlining process made some programs more efficient, cutting time needed to prepare for them in half.

After extensive evaluation, the 166th Aviation Brigade completed training for the Combat Aviation Brigade (CAB), 34th Infantry Division on 4 August 2008. The brigade returned to Fort Riley for a month before beginning the process over again with pre-mobilization training of the CAB, 28th Infantry Division, and returned to Fort Sill for post-mobilization training in late January 2008.

As part of a First Army realignment of training support brigades, the Department of the Army approved a change of station for First Army – Division West and two of its training support brigades. The 166th Aviation Brigade moved to Fort Hood, Texas on 15 July 2009. The brigade's Active Component battalions, all of which are aviation units, moved at a later date, most likely the summer 2010 (with the exception of 1st Battalion, 291st Regiment, which was already located at the installation). The 166th Aviation Brigade inactivated at Fort hood on 24 June 2015. The 166th Aviation Brigade reactivated at Fort Hood on 17 August 2018.

== Decorations ==
Ribbon	Award	Year	Orders
	Army Superior Unit Award	2008–2011	Permanent Orders 332-07 announcing award of the Army Superior Unit award
