= 340th Infantry Regiment =

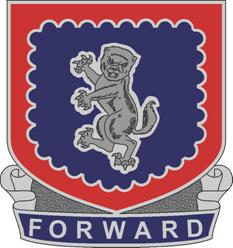
- Regimental Distinctive Unit Insignia
- Active: 1917–1919; 1921-1952; 1959–present
- Country: USA
- Branch: U.S. Army
- Role: Infantry
- Size: Regiment
- Part of: First Army
- Motto: Forward
- Anniversaries: Constituted 5 August 1917 in the National Army
- Decorations: Army Superior Unit Award
- Battle honours: World War I

The 340th Infantry Regiment was a National Army unit first organized for service in World War I as part of the 85th Infantry Division in Europe. Since then it has served as a training regiment, training Army Reserve and Army National Guard soldiers fighting in the War in Afghanistan (2001-2021) and the War in Iraq (2003 onwards).

== Service history ==
=== World War I ===
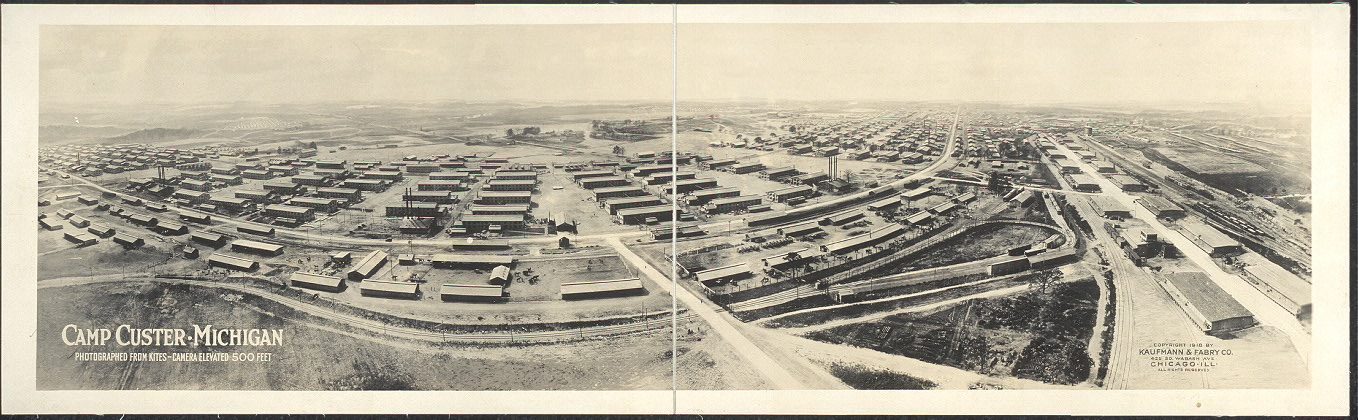

. The regiment was constituted 5 August 1917 in the National Army as the 340th Infantry and assigned to the 170th Infantry Brigade of the 85th Division. It was organized at Camp Custer, Michigan on during August and September 1917. In July 1943, the regiment was organized with 3,755 officers and enlisted men:

- Headquarters & Headquarters Company- 303
  - Supply Company- 140
  - Machine Gun Company- 178
  - Medical & Chaplain Detachment- 56
- Infantry Battalion (x3)- 1,026
  - Headquarters- 2
  - Rifle Company (x4)- 256

The Doughboys of the regiment deployed to France as part of the American Expeditionary Forces and were billeted in the city of Humbligny. The regiment didn't participate in any named campaigns during the war; its Infantrymen were used as individual replacements to the fighting Divisions. Pioneering American football player, physician, and local politician Bradbury Robinson commanded Company L during the war. After completing its war service in France the regiment demobilized at Camp Custer on 21 April 1919.

=== Post War Service ===
The Regiment was reconstituted on 24 June 1921 in the Organized Reserves with headquarters in the Saginaw, Michigan under TOE 29-7T as part of the 85th Division (later redesignated as the 85th Infantry Division) in the Sixth Corps Area. The 1st Battalion was located in Saginaw, the 2nd Battalion at Flint, Michigan and the 3rd Battalion was at Port Huron, Michigan. The entire regiment relocated on 28 July 1937 to Saginaw. During this period, the regiment conducted summer encampments in most years with the 2d Infantry Regiment at Camp Custer or some years at Camp Grayling. In 1929 the regiment conducted summer training with the 126th Infantry Regiment at Camp Grayling. The regiment conducted infantry CMTC training some years at Camp Custer, Fort Brady, Michigan, as an alternate form of summer training. Primary ROTC feeder schools were the Michigan State College of Agriculture and Applied Science. The regiment was relieved 31 March 1942 from assignment to the 85th Division under the wartime reorganization from the four-regiment square division to the three-regiment triangular division structure, allotted to the Army of the United States as an inactive unit, and finally disbanded on 4 August 1952.

=== Under the 85th Training Division ===
1972 Regimental Lineage & Honors statement detailing the history, composition and battle honors for the unit.

On May 5, 1959 the 340th Infantry was redesignated a subordinate element of the 85th Division (Training Support) as the 340th Regiment (Advanced Individual Training), and reorganized to consist of the Regimental Headquarters and Headquarters Company, Headquarters and Headquarters Companies 1st, 2d, and 3d Battalions, and Companies A, B, and C organized as Infantry with the below listed companies organized from other units:

Previous Unit	Action	Redesignated as
Tank Company, 335th Infantry Regiment	redesignated	Company D (Armor)
Battery B, 134th Anti-Aircraft Artillery Battalion	redesignated	Battery E (Air Defense)
Battery A, 403rd Field Artillery Battalion	redesignated	Company F (Field Artillery)
Company A, 310th Engineer Battalion	redesignated	Company G (Engineer)
Company B, 310th Engineer Battalion	redesignated	Company H (Engineer)
None	constituted	Company I (Chemical)
Company B, 785th Ordnance Battalion	redesignated	Company K (Ordnance)
Medical Company, 337th Infantry Regiment	redesignated	Company L (Medical)
85th Military Police Company	redesignated	Company M (Military Police)

The 340th Regiment was reorganized January 31, 1968 to consist of the 1st Battalion (Advanced Individual Training) and the 2nd and 3rd Battalions (Basic Combat Training). The Regimental Headquarters was inactivated. On May 1, 1971, the 1st Battalion (Advanced Individual Training) was redesignated as 1st Battalion (Combat Support Training) with no change to the 2nd and 3rd Battalions. The 3rd Battalion was inactivated on 1 October 1996 and reactivated on 1 October 2002. On 1 April 2007, the 1st and 2nd Battalions were assigned away from the 85th Division; on 15 June 2008 the 3rd Battalion was also reassigned.

=== Current Assignment ===
The 1st Battalion is an Army Reserve unit assigned to the 181st Infantry Brigade at Fort Snelling, Minnesota and provides Observer, Controller/ Trainers (OC/T) and Staff to various Mobilization Training Centers responsible for conducting post mobilization training to Reserve Component units preparing them for deployment to Overseas Contingency Operations.

The 2nd Battalion is an Army Reserve unit assigned to the 4th Cavalry Brigade and provides Observer, Controller/ Trainers (OC/T) and Staff to various Mobilization Training Centers responsible for conducting post mobilization training to Reserve Component units preparing them for deployment to Overseas Contingency Operations.
The 3rd Battalion is a Regular Army unit assigned to the 181st Infantry Brigade and stationed at Fort McCoy, Wisconsin with a mission to train Infantry units of the Army National Guard.

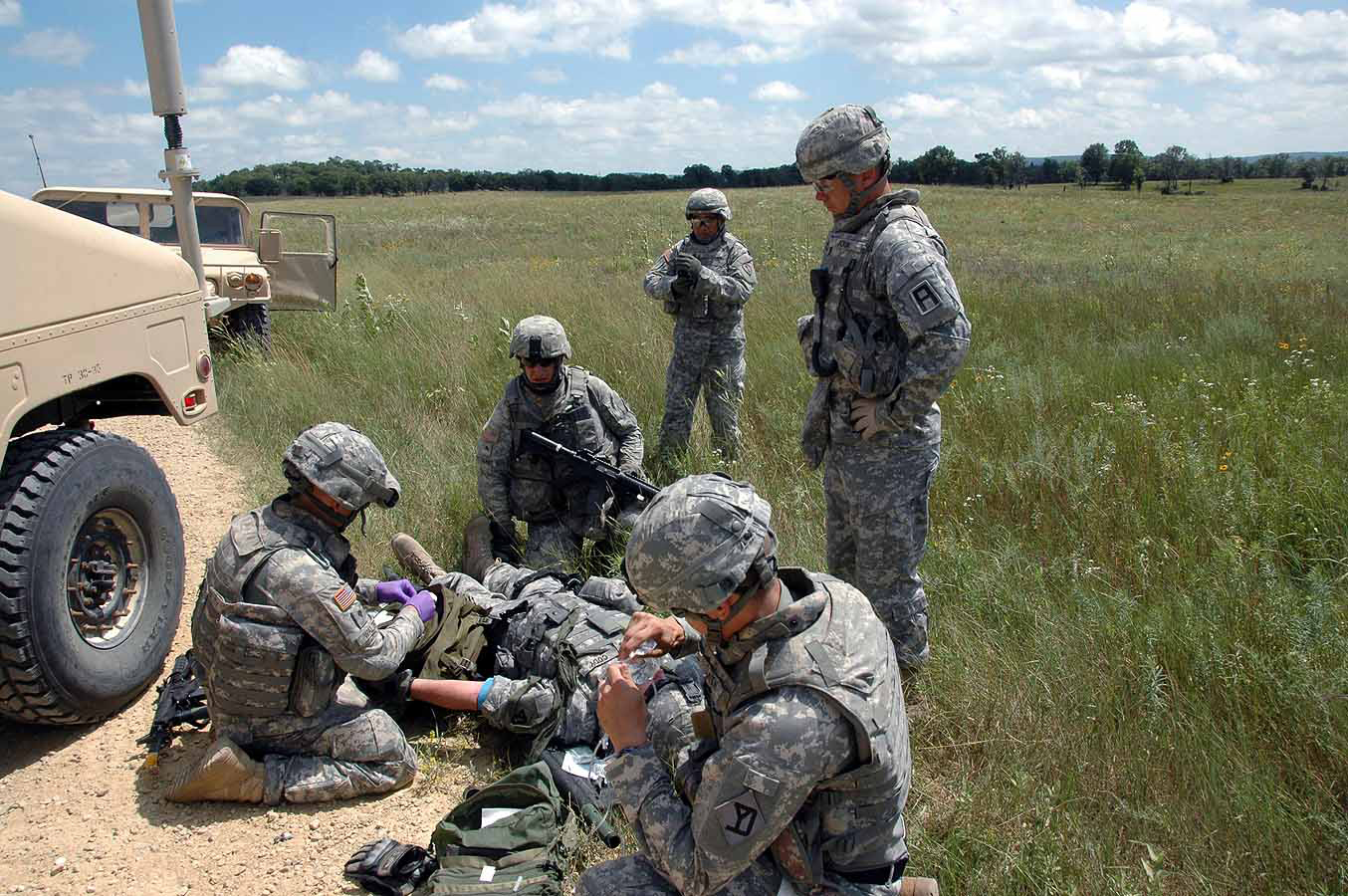
1st Battalion training the 26th Maneuver Enhancement Brigade in 2009

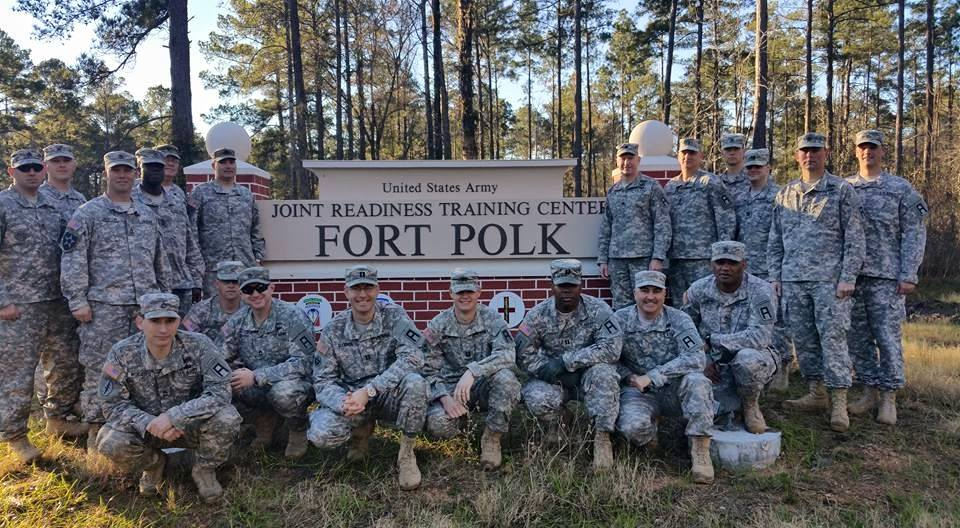
3rd Battalion supporting JRTC January 2016

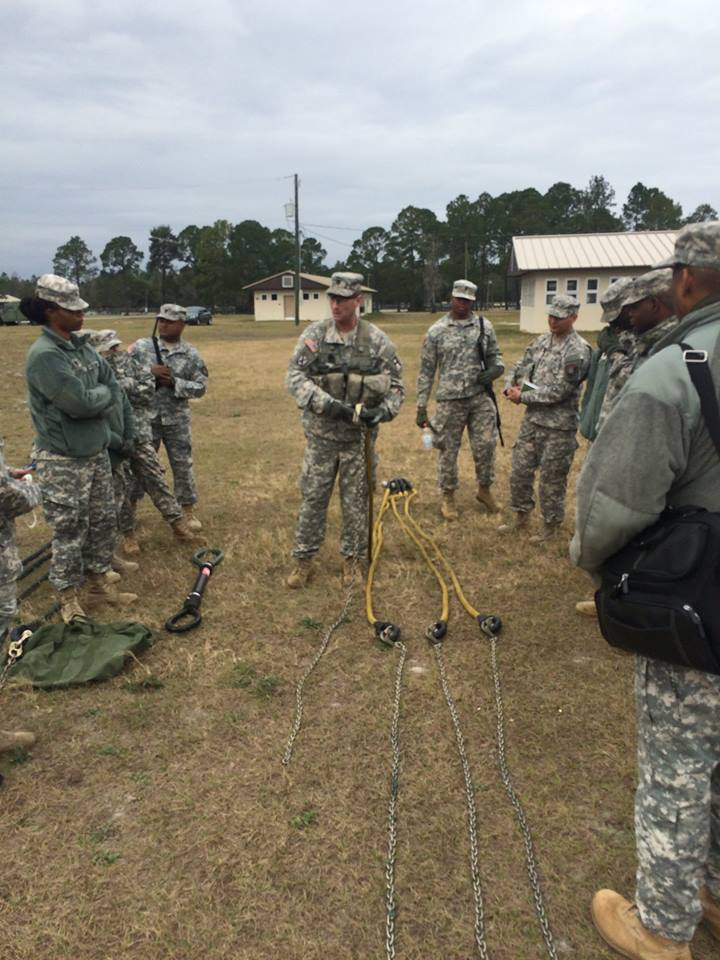
3rd Battalion conduct sling load training for the 856th Quartermaster Company at Camp Blanding February 2016.

== Campaign streamers ==
Conflict	Streamer	Year(s)
World War I	No Inscription	1917-1919

== Decorations ==
Ribbon	Award	Year	Inscription	Notes	
	Army Meritorious Unit Commendation	2021-2022	Afghanistan Retrograde 2021-2022	3rd Battalion	Permanent Orders 032-0001 announcing award of the Army Meritorious Unit Commendation
	Army Superior Unit Award	2003-2004	None	1st Battalion; 3rd Battalion	Permanent Orders 123-18 announcing award of the Army Superior Unit award
	Army Superior Unit Award	2005-2006	None	2nd Battalion	
	Army Superior Unit Award	2008-2011	None	1st Battalion; 2nd Battalion; 3rd Battalion	Permanent Orders 332-07 announcing award of the Army Superior Unit award
None	Secretary of the Army Superior Unit Certificate	1961-1962	None	Headquarters Company, 3rd Battalion	DA GO 14, 20 March 1963
None	Secretary of the Army Superior Unit Certificate	1960-1961	None	Headquarters Company of 1st Battalion; Headquarters, K and L Companies of 3rd Battalion	Department of the Army General Orders 15, 1962

== Shoulder sleeve insignia ==

* Description: On a background equally divided horizontally white and red, 3 1/4 inches (83 mm) high and 2 1/2 inches (64 mm) wide at base and 2 1/8 inches (54 mm) wide at top, a black block letter "A", 2 3/4 inches (70 mm) high, 2 inches (51 mm) wide at base and 1 5/8 inches (41 mm) wide at top, all members 7/16 inch (11 mm) wide, all enclosed within a 1/8 inch (3.2 mm) Army Green border.

- Symbolism:
1. The red and white of the background are the colors used in flags for Armies.
2. The letter "A" represents "Army" and is also the first letter of the alphabet suggesting "First Army."
- Background:
1. A black letter "A" was approved as the authorized insignia by the Commanding General, American Expedition Force, on 16 November 1918 and approved by the War Department on 5 May 1922.
2. The background was added on 17 November 1950.

== Distinctive unit insignia ==
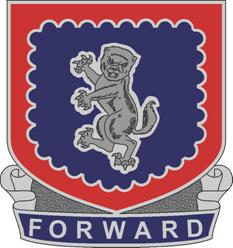

- Description/Blazon A Silver color metal and enamel device 1 inch (25 mm) in height overall consisting of a shield blazoned: Azure, a wolverine guardant rampant Argent, within a bordure engrailed Gules. Attached below the shield a Blue scroll inscribed "FORWARD" in Silver letters.
- Symbolism The shield is taken from the arms of Bourges in the old province of Berry, the nearest arm-bearing city to Humbligny where the organization was stationed during World War I. The shield of both Berry and Bourges were blue with a red engrailed border. The silver wolverine indicates that allocation of the regiment to Michigan.
- Background The distinctive unit insignia was originally approved for the 340th Infantry Regiment, Organized Reserves on 30 March 1928. It was redesignated for the 340th Regiment on 7 December 1959. The insignia was amended to update the description on 14 September 1999.

== Coat of arms ==
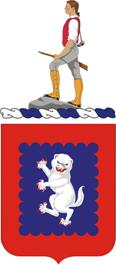

- Description/Blazon
  - Shield: Azure, a wolverine guardant rampant Argent armed and langued Gules within a bordure engrailed of the third.
  - Crest: That for the regiments and separate battalions of the Army Reserve: On a wreath of the colors Argent and Azure, the Lexington Minute Man Proper. The statue of the Minute Man, Captain John Parker (H.H. Kitson, sculptor), stands on the Common in Lexington, Massachusetts.
  - Motto: FORWARD
- Symbolism
  - Shield: The shield is taken from the arms of Bourges in the old province of Berry, the nearest arm-bearing city to Humbligny where the organization was stationed during World War I. The shield of both Berry and Bourges were blue with a red engrailed border. The silver wolverine indicates that allocation of the regiment to Michigan
  - Crest: The crest is that of the United States Army Reserve.
  - Background : The coat of arms was originally approved for the 340th Infantry Regiment, Organized Reserves on 30 March 1928. It was redesignated for the 340th Regiment on 7 December 1959. The coat of arms was amended to update the blazon on 14 September 1999.
