= 479th Field Artillery Brigade (United States) =

- 479th Field Artillery Brigade shoulder sleeve insignia
- Active: 1944–45; 1947–96; 1997–99; 2006–2015
- Country: USA
- Branch: U.S. Army
- Type: Headquarters
- Garrison/HQ: Fort Sill
- Motto: Dependable Support
- Engagements: World War II; Iraq Conflict

Insignia
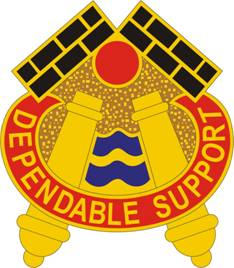
- Distinctive unit insignia

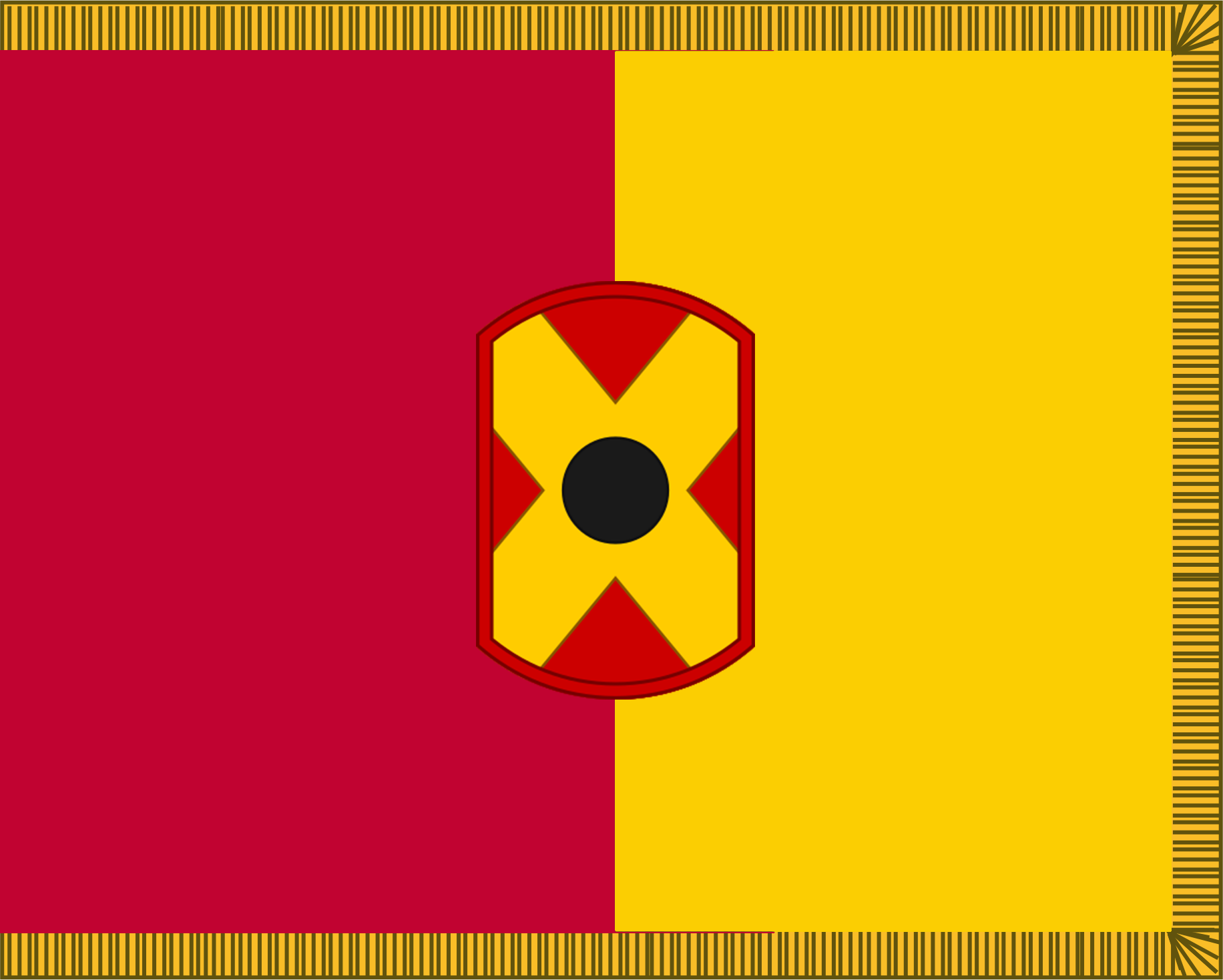
- 479th Field Artillery Brigade Flag

The 656th Field Artillery Battalion was constituted 11 March 1944 in the Army of the United States.

== Lineage ==
- Constituted 11 March 1944 in the Army of the United States as the 656th Field Artillery Battalion
- Activated 20 April 1944 at Camp Rucker, Alabama
- Deployed via New York Port of Embarkation 30 November 1944
- Arrived in England 8 December 1944
- Arrived in France on 3 March 1945
- Located at Berg Reichenstein, Germany on 14 August 1945
- Returned to CONUS via New York Port of Embarkation on 29 November 1945
- Inactivated 1 December 1945 at Camp Kilmer, New Jersey
- Headquarters and Headquarters Battery, 656th Field Artillery Battalion, redesignated 24 December 1946 as Headquarters and Headquarters Battery, 479th Field Artillery Group, and allotted to the Organized Reserves (remainder of 656th Field Artillery Battalion concurrently disbanded)
- Activated 2 January 2 January 1947 at Philadelphia, Pennsylvania
- (Organized Reserves redesignated 25 March 1948 as the Organized Reserve Corps; redesignated 9 July 1952 as the Army Reserve)
- Reorganized and redesignated 25 May 1959 as Headquarters and Headquarters Battery, 479th Artillery Group
- Location changed 1 May 1960 to Horsham, Pennsylvania; location changed 31 January 1968 to Pittsburgh, Pennsylvania
- Redesignated 1 November 1971 as Headquarters and Headquarters Battery, 479th Field Artillery Group
- Redesignated 16 April 1980 as Headquarters and Headquarters Battery, 479th Field Artillery Brigade
- Inactivated 15 15 September 1996 at Pittsburgh, Pennsylvania
- Withdrawn 24 October 1997 from the Army Reserve and allotted to the Regular Army; Headquarters concurrently activated at Fort Sill, Oklahoma
- Inactivated 16 October 1999 at Fort Sill, Oklahoma
- Headquarters activated 1 December 2006 at Fort Sill, Oklahoma using the assets & personnel of 4th Brigade, 75th Division (Training Support)
- Deactivated 30 June 2015 at Fort Sill

== Subordinate units ==
- 1st Battalion. 289th Regiment (CS/CSS)
- 2nd Battalion. 290th Regiment (CS/CSS)
- 2nd Battalion. 381st Regiment (CS/CSS)
- 1st Battalion. 382nd Regiment (LSB)
- 1st Battalion. 393rd Regiment (Infantry)
- 3rd Battalion. 393rd Regiment (Field Artillery)
- 1st Battalion. 395th Regiment (Engineers)
- 3rd Battalion. 395th Regiment (Armored)

== Honors ==
=== Campaign participation credit ===
- World War II:
  - Rhineland;
  - Central Europe

=== Decorations ===
- None
