= Superior Unit Award =

United States Army decoration

Army Superior Unit Award
- Type: Ribbon and Streamer
- Awarded for: "Outstanding meritorious performance of a difficult and challenging mission carried out under extraordinary circumstances."
- Presented by: the Department of the Army
- Eligibility: Military Unit
- Status: Currently awarded
- First award: 1985
- Final award: Ongoing
- Streamer for the Superior Unit Award

Precedence
- Next (higher): Army, Naval Service, and Coast Guard: Meritorious Unit Commendation
- Equivalent: Air and Space Forces: Air and Space Outstanding Unit Award; Coast Guard: Meritorious Team Commendation
- Next (lower): Unit Awards of Foreign Governments

The Superior Unit Award is a decoration of the United States Army which is awarded in peacetime to any unit of the Army which displays outstanding meritorious performance of a difficult and challenging mission carried out under extraordinary circumstances.

The Army Superior Unit Award (ASUA) was created in 1985. The award is composed of a green and red ribbon, enclosed within a gold frame.

== Background ==
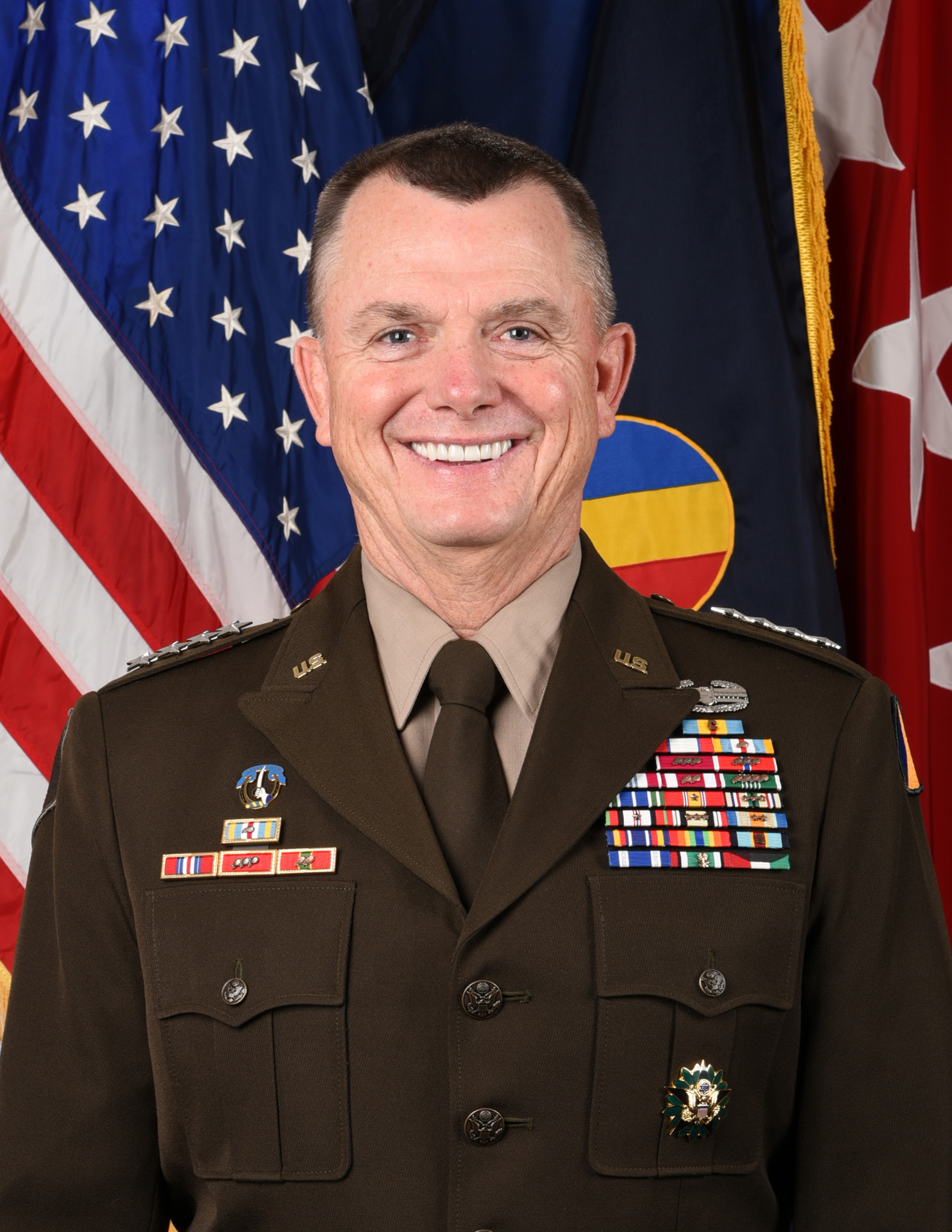
General Paul E. Funk II wearing the Army Superior Unit Award with two oak leaf clusters signifying three awards of the ASUA

As part of the Army Cohesion and Stability Study (ARCOST) of 1980, a proposal to adopt the Army Superior Unit Award was forwarded to Major Army Commands (MACOMs) for comment on 18 March 1981. This recommendation was based on the fact that present Army unit awards were for combat service only. While all MACOM and most of the Army Staff supported the proposal, the leadership elected not to approve the new award. In 1984, the Vice Chief of Staff, Army, directed that a Peacetime Unit Award be developed and submitted for approval. In April 1985, the Secretary of the Army (SECARMY) approved the Army Superior Unit Award for meritorious unit performance of a uniquely difficult and challenging mission under extraordinary circumstances that involved the national interest. As a result of the strict criteria and lack of approving awards, the criteria were changed by SECARMY in July 1986. This change deleted the words "unique" and "national interest". Only two units were awarded the ASUA prior to the revision. The first ASUA was awarded to the 164th Military Police Company, 59th Ordnance Brigade, Miesau, West Germany, in May 1985 for its anti-terrorism work during NATO nuclear operations. The second went to the 3d Battalion, 502d Infantry, 101st Airborne Division. Nearly 200 of the 248 soldiers who were killed in the crash of Arrow Air Flight 1285 in Gander, Newfoundland, were from the battalion and were on their way home in December 1985 from duty with the Multinational Force and Observers in the Sinai Desert.

On 17 September 1991, in a memorandum to the Secretary of the Army, The Adjutant General (TAG) requested approval to create a lapel pin to be worn by all members of units awarded the Army Superior Unit Award. This recommendation was based on the fact that the award was being presented to units with a significant number of civilians assigned and there was no visible means of recognizing them. This change permitted issue of an emblem to both military and civilian personnel. The Secretary of the Army approved the recommendation on 12 December 1991. Source: United States Army (2009)

The emblem is worn by all members of a cited organization and is considered an individual decoration for persons in connection with the cited acts and may be worn whether or not they continue as members of the organization. Other personnel may wear this decoration while serving with an organization to indicate the unit has been awarded the Army Superior Unit Award. Source: United States Army (2009)

Permanent Orders 123-18

Permanent Orders 332-07

Permanent Orders 350-09

== See also ==
- Awards and decorations of the United States military
- Awards and decorations of the United States Army
