= 24th Infantry Division (United States) =

1921–2006 United States Army division

- 24th Infantry Division shoulder sleeve insignia, with Taro leaf
- Active: 1 February 1921–15 April 1970; 21 September 1975–15 February 1996; 5 June 1999–1 August 2006
- Country: United States
- Branch: United States Army
- Type: Infantry
- Role: Mechanized infantry
- Size: Division (12,500–14,500) Mobilization (35,000–50,000)
- Nicknames: "Taro Division", "Victory Division" (special designation)
- Motto: First to Fight
- Engagements: World War II; Central Pacific; New Guinea; Leyte; Luzon; Southern Philippines; Korean War; UN Defensive; UN Offensive; First UN Counteroffensive; CCF Spring Offensive; Operation Blue Bat; Gulf War; Defense of Saudi Arabia; Liberation of Kuwait

Commanders
- Notable commanders: Complete list

Insignia
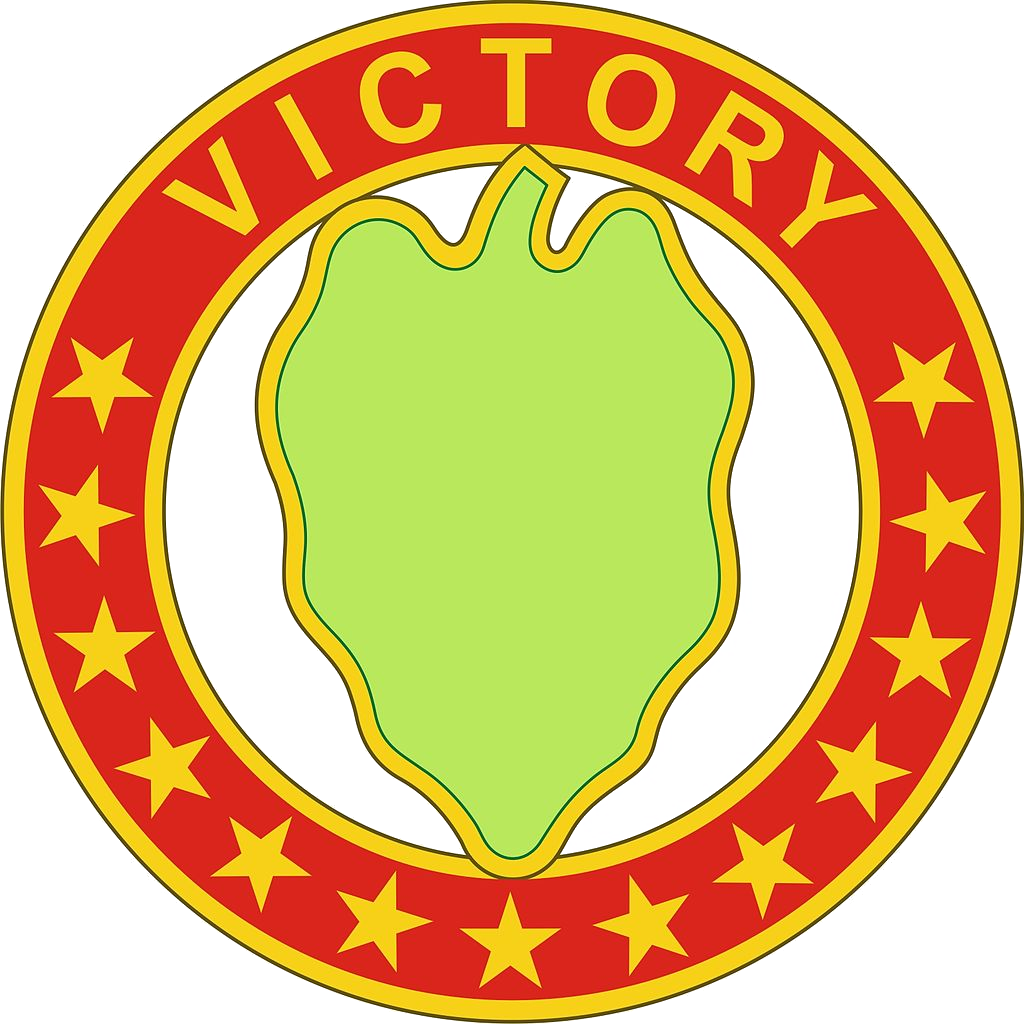
- Distinctive unit insignia

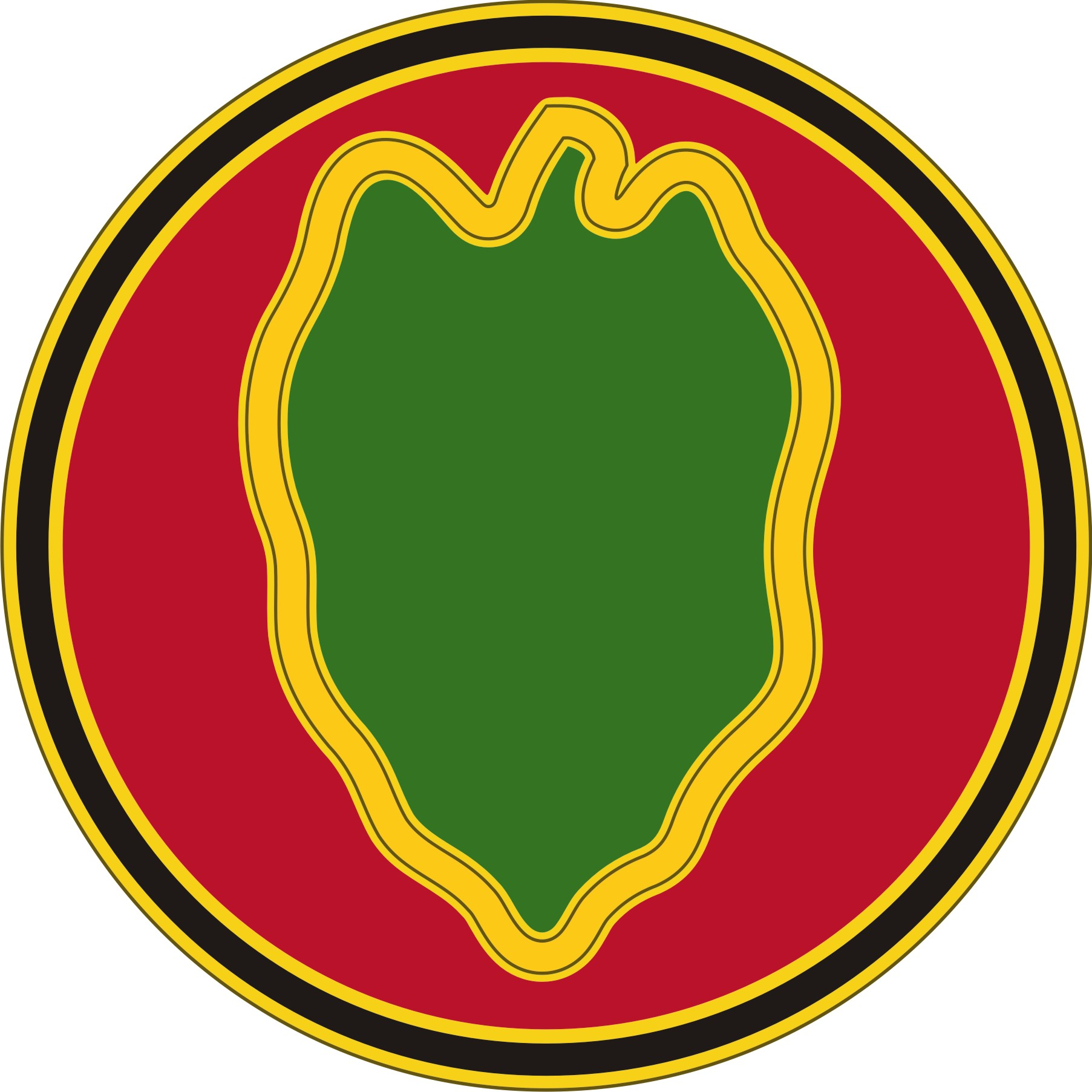
- Combat service identification badge

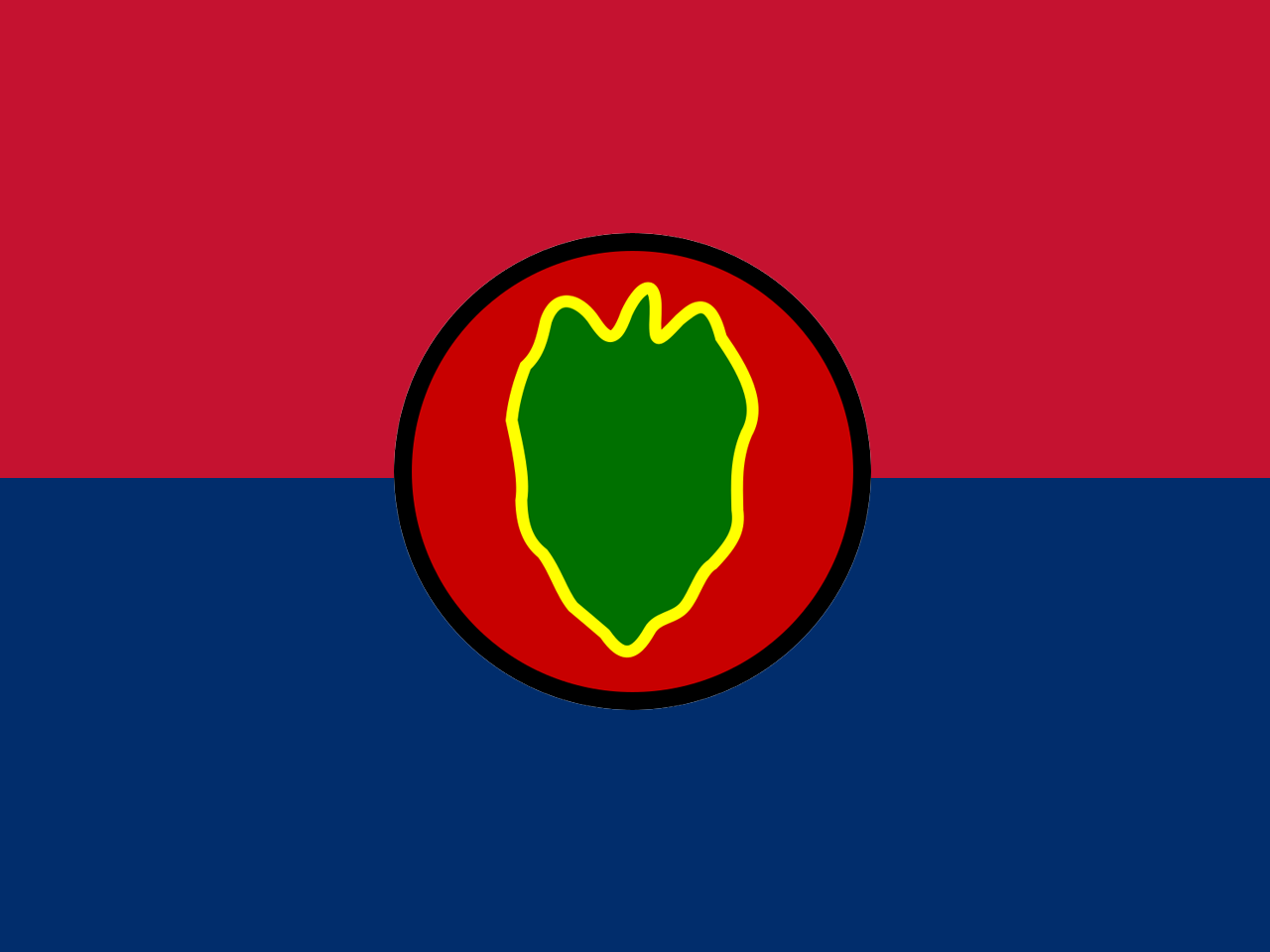
- Flag of the United States Army 24th Infantry Division

The 24th Infantry Division was an infantry division of the United States Army that was deactivated in October 1996. Formed during World War II from the disbanding Hawaiian Division, the division saw action throughout the Pacific theater, first fighting in New Guinea before landing on the Philippine islands of Leyte and Luzon, driving Japanese forces from them. Following the end of the war, the division participated in occupation duties in Japan, and was the first division to respond at the outbreak of the Korean War. For the first 18 months of the war, the division was heavily engaged on the front lines with North Korean and Chinese forces, suffering over 10,000 casualties. It was withdrawn from the front lines to the reserve force for the remainder of the war after the second battle for Wonju, but returned to Korea for patrol duty at the end of major combat operations.

After its deployment in the Korean War, the division was active in Europe and the United States during the Cold War. It was based at Fort Stewart, Georgia and later reactivated at Fort Riley, Kansas. It did not see combat again until the Persian Gulf War, when it faced the Iraqi military. A few years after that conflict, it was inactivated as part of the post-Cold War U.S. military drawdown of the 1990s. The division was reactivated in October 1999 as a formation for training and deploying U.S. Army National Guard units before its deactivation in October 2006.

== History ==
=== Hawaiian Division ===
The 24th Infantry Division traces its lineage to Army units activated in Hawaii. It was activated under the Square Division Table of Organization and Equipment (TO&E) on 1 March 1921 as the Hawaiian Division at Schofield Barracks, Oahu. The division insignia is based on the taro leaf, emblematic of Hawaii. The 21st Infantry Regiment and the 22nd Infantry Regiment was assigned to the Division, both of which had been assigned to the US 11th Infantry Division prior to 1921.

The entire Hawaiian Division was concentrated at a single location during the next few years, allowing it to conduct more effective combined arms training. It was also manned at higher personnel levels than other divisions, and its field artillery was the first to be motorized.

Between August and September 1941, the Hawaiian Division's assets were reorganized to form two divisions under the new Triangular Division TO&E. Its brigade headquarters were disbanded and the 27th and 35th Infantry Regiments were assigned to the new 25th Infantry Division. Hawaiian Division headquarters was redesignated as Headquarters, 24th Infantry Division on 1 October 1941. The 24th Infantry Division also received the Hawaiian Division's Shoulder Sleeve Insignia, which was approved in 1921.

=== World War II ===
==== Division organization ====
The division was centered around three infantry regiments: the 19th Infantry Regiment and the 21st Infantry Regiment from the old Hawaiian Division, and the 299th Infantry Regiment from the Hawaii National Guard. In July 1942, the 299th Infantry was inactivated after its ranks were depleted by the transfer of many Nisei (second-generation Japanese-Americans) to form the 100th Infantry Battalion, and the 25th Infantry Division's 298th Infantry Regiment was reassigned to the 24th. Also part of the division were the 11th Field Artillery Battalion, the 13th Field Artillery Battalion, the 52nd Field Artillery Battalion, the 63rd Field Artillery Battalion, the 24th Signal Company, the 724th Ordnance Light Maintenance Company, the 24th Quartermaster Company, the 24th Reconnaissance Troop, the 3rd Engineer Combat Battalion, the 24th Medical Battalion. Additionally the 24th Counterintelligence Corps Detachment was attached to the division.

24th Infantry Division organization (click to enlarge)

- 24th Infantry Division
  - 24th Infantry Division Headquarters
  - 24th Cavalry Reconnaissance Troop (Mechanized) (M3 scout cars and then M8 Greyhound armored cars)
  - 19th Infantry Regiment
    - Headquarters and Headquarters Company
    - 3× Infantry battalions
      - each battalion consists of: 1× Headquarters and Headquarters Company, 3× Rifle companies, 1× Heavy Weapons Company
    - Cannon Company (T12 Gun Motor Carriages and T19 Howitzer Motor Carriages, later replaced by either M3 105mm towed howitzers or M7 Priest self propelled howitzers)
    - Anti-Tank Company (M3 37mm anti-tank guns, which were replaced by 1944 with M1 57mm anti-tank guns)
    - Service Company
  - 21st Infantry Regiment
    - same organization as 19th Infantry Regiment
  - 34th Infantry Regiment (assigned to the division on 12 June 1943)
    - same organization as 19th Infantry Regiment
  - 298th Infantry Regiment (Hawaii Army National Guard; assigned to the division on 23 July 1942; relieved from assignment to the division on 12 June 1943)
    - same organization as 19th Infantry Regiment
  - 299th Infantry Regiment (Hawaii Army National Guard; inactivated on 21 July 1942)
    - same organization as 19th Infantry Regiment
  - 24th Infantry Division Artillery
    - Headquarters and Headquarters Battery
    - 11th Field Artillery Battalion
      - Headquarters and Headquarters Battery
      - 3× Batteries (M1 155mm towed howitzers)
      - Service Battery
    - 13th Field Artillery Battalion
      - Headquarters and Headquarters Battery
      - 3× Batteries (M2 105mm towed howitzers)
      - Service Battery
    - 52nd Field Artillery Battalion
      - same organization as 13th Field Artillery Battalion
    - 63rd Field Artillery Battalion
      - same organization as 13th Field Artillery Battalion
  - Headquarters Special Troops
    - Headquarters Company, 24th Infantry Division
    - 24th Signal Company
    - 24th Quartermaster Company
    - 724th Ordnance Light Maintenance Company
    - 24th Military Police Platoon
    - 24th Infantry Division Band (attached)
  - 3rd Engineer Combat Battalion
    - Headquarters and Headquarters and Service Company
    - 3× Engineer combat companies
  - 24th Medical Battalion
    - Headquarters and Headquarters Detachment
    - 3× Collecting companies
    - Clearing Company

==== Combat chronicle ====
The 24th Infantry Division was among the first US Army divisions to see combat in World War II and among the last to stop fighting. The division was on Oahu, with its headquarters at Schofield Barracks, when the Japanese launched their Attack on Pearl Harbor on 7 December 1941 and the unit suffered some casualties during the attack. Among these casualties were Sgt. Paul J. Fadon (killed in a truck 10 miles north of Schofield Barracks), Pvt. Walter R. French, Pfc. Conrad Kujawa, Pvt. Torao Migita (killed by friendly fire in downtown Honolulu), and Corporal Theodore J. Lewis (who became the 24th Infantry Division's first soldier killed during WWII). The division was then charged with the defense of northern Oahu, where it built an elaborate system of coastal defenses throughout 1942. In July 1942, the 299th Infantry Regiment was replaced by the 298th Infantry Regiment. One year later, this regiment was replaced by the 34th Infantry Regiment from the Hawaiian Department Reserve. The 34th Infantry remained with the 24th Infantry Division until the end of the war. As an active component unit, the 34th was easier to deploy than the reserve component units, which were less trained.

===== Hollandia =====
In May 1943, the 24th Infantry Division was alerted for movement to Australia, and it completed the move to Camp Caves, near Rockhampton, on the eastern coast of Australia by 19 September 1943. Once deployed, it began intensive combat training. After training, the division moved to Goodenough Island on 31 January 1944, to prepare for Operation Reckless, the amphibious capture of Hollandia, Netherlands New Guinea (now Jayapura, Papua province, Indonesia).

The 24th landed at Tanahmerah Bay on 22 April 1944 and seized the important Hollandia Airdrome despite torrential rain and marshy terrain. Shortly after the Hollandia landing, the division's 34th Infantry Regiment moved to Biak to reinforce the 41st Infantry Division. The regiment captured Sorido and Borokoe airdromes before returning to the division on Hollandia in July. The 41st and 24th divisions isolated 40,000 Japanese forces south of the landings. Despite resistance from the isolated Japanese forces in the area, the 24th Infantry Division advanced rapidly through the region. In two months, the 24th Division crossed the entirety of New Guinea.

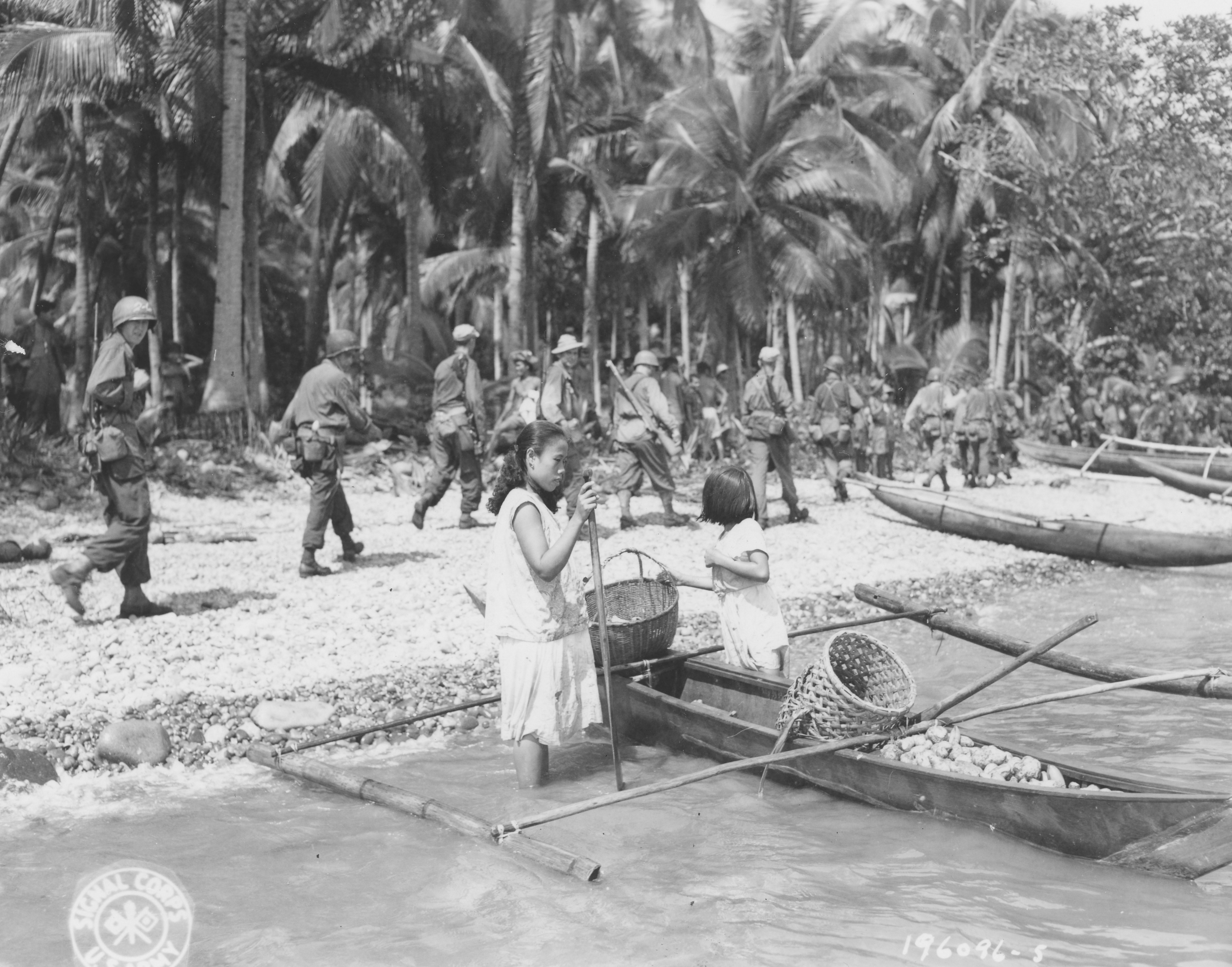
Men of the 24th Division march past Filipinos on the beach at Leyte Island.

===== Leyte =====
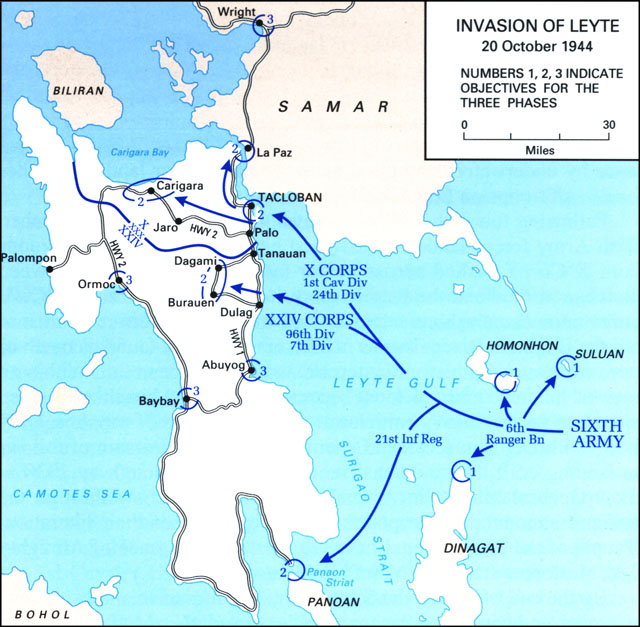
A tactical map for the Invasion of Leyte on 20 October 1944. The 24th Infantry Division landed in the northern part of the island with X Corps.

After occupation duty in the Hollandia area, the 24th Division was assigned to X Corps of the Sixth United States Army in preparation for the invasion of the Philippines. On 20 October 1944, the division was paired with the 1st Cavalry Division within X Corps, and the two divisions made an assault landing at Leyte, initially encountering only light resistance. Following a defeat at sea on 26 October, the Japanese launched a large, uncoordinated counteroffensive against the Sixth Army. The 24th Division drove up the Leyte Valley, advanced to Jaro and captured Breakneck Ridge on 12 November 1944, in heavy fighting.

While final clearing operations continued on Leyte, the 24th Division's 19th Infantry Regiment moved to Mindoro Island as part of the Western Visayan Task Force and landed in the San Jose area on 15 December 1944. There, it secured airfields and a patrol base for operations on Luzon. Elements of the 24th Infantry Division effected a landing on Marinduque Island. Other elements supported the 11th Airborne Division drive from Nasugbu to Manila.

===== Luzon =====
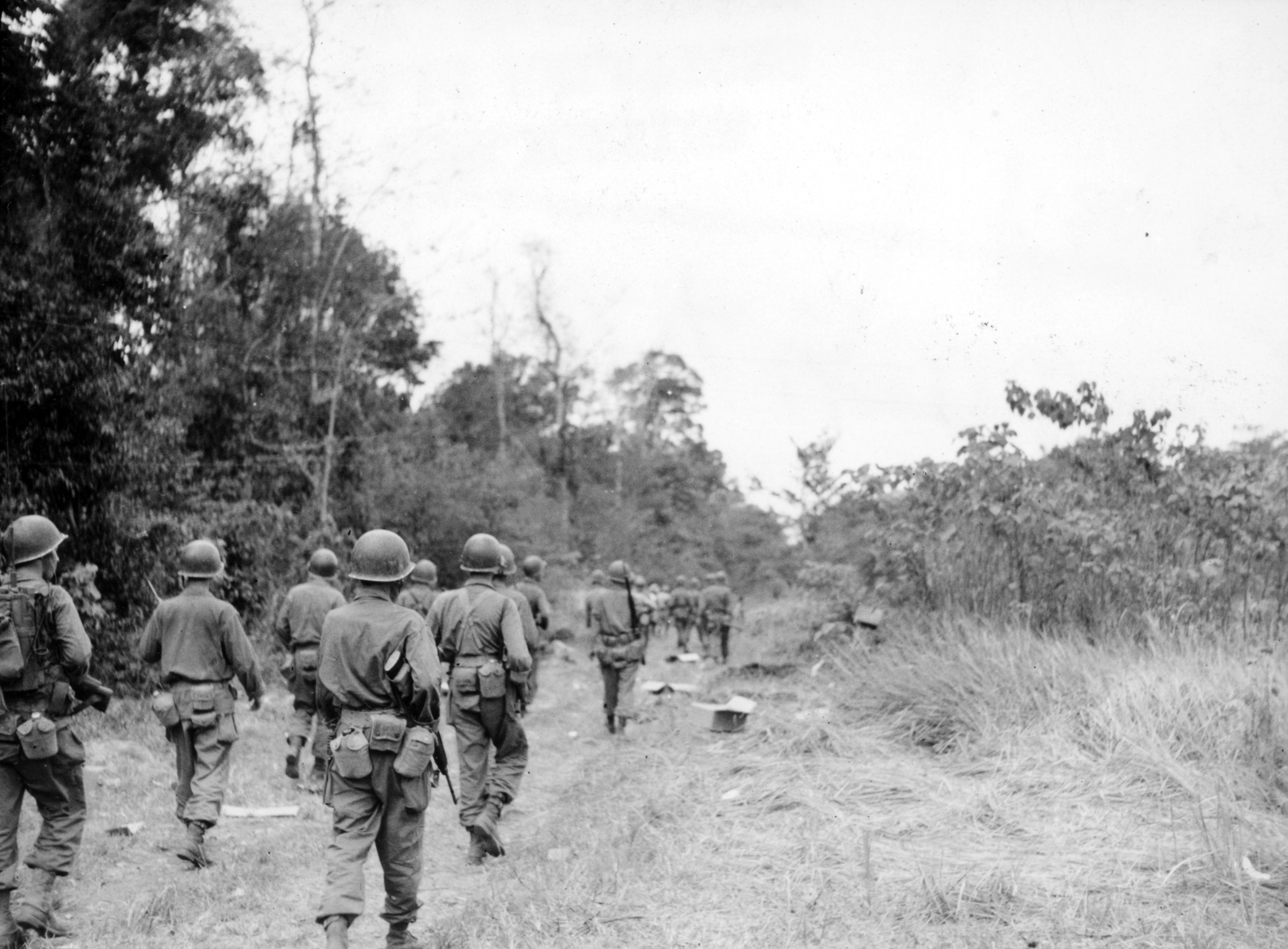
A patrol from the AT Company, 34th Infantry, moves out to rescue some Filipinos near Digos, Mindanao, led by some of the Filipinos who managed to escape, April 29, 1945.

The 24th Division was among the 200,000 men of the Sixth Army which moved to recapture Luzon from the Japanese 14th Area Army, which fought delaying actions on the island. The division's 34th Infantry Regiment landed at San Antonio, Zambales on 29 January 1945 and ran into a furious battle on Zig Zag Pass, where it suffered heavy casualties. On 16 February 1945 the 3rd Battalion, 34th Infantry took part in the amphibious landing on Corregidor and fought the Japanese on the well-defended island. The rest of the division landed at Sablayan, Mindoro on 19 February, cleared the remainder of the island and engaged in numerous mopping up actions during the following month. These operations were complete by 18 March, and the division moved south to attack through Basilan. the division landed at Mindanao on 17 April 1945 and cut across the island to Digos until 27 April, stormed into Davao on 3 May, and cleared Libby airdrome on 13 May. Although the campaign officially closed on 30 June, the division continued to clear up Japanese resistance during July and August 1945. The 24th Infantry Division and the Philippine Commonwealth military patrolled the region until the official surrender of Japan ended the war. On 15 October 1945 the division left Mindanao for occupation duty on mainland Japan.

World War II statistics

- Total battle casualties: 7,012
- Killed in action: 1,374
- Wounded in action: 5,621
- Missing in action: 11
- Prisoners of war: 6

Four soldiers were awarded the Medal of Honor during their service with the 24th Infantry Division during World War II. They were James H. Diamond, Charles E. Mower, Harold H. Moon Jr., and Francis B. Wai. Members of the 24th Infantry Division also won 15 Distinguished Service Crosses, two Distinguished Service Medals, 625 Silver Star Medals, 38 Soldier's Medals, 2,197 Bronze Star Medals, and 50 Air Medals. The division itself was awarded eight Distinguished Unit Citations for participation in the campaign.

===== Occupation of Japan =====
After the end of the war, the division remained on mainland Japan. It occupied Kyūshū from 1945 until 1950. During this time, the US Army shrank. At the end of World War II it contained 89 divisions, but by 1950, the 24th Infantry Division was one of only 10 active divisions in the force. It was one of four understrength divisions on occupation duty in Japan. The others were the 1st Cavalry Division, 7th Infantry Division, and 25th Infantry Division, all under control of the Eighth United States Army. The 24th Division retained the 19th, 21st, and 34th regiments, but the formations were undermanned and ill-equipped due to the post-war drawdown and reduction in military spending.

=== Korean War ===
On 25 June 1950, 10 divisions of the North Korean Korean People's Army (KPA) launched an attack into the Republic of Korea in the south. The North Koreans overwhelmed the Republic of Korea Army (ROKA) and advanced south, preparing to conquer the entire nation. The UN ordered an intervention to prevent the conquest of South Korea. U.S. President Harry S. Truman ordered ground forces into South Korea. The 24th Infantry Division was closest to Korea, and it was the first US division to respond. The 24th Division's first mission was to "take the initial shock" of the North Korean assault, then try to slow its advance until more US divisions could arrive.

==== Task Force Smith ====
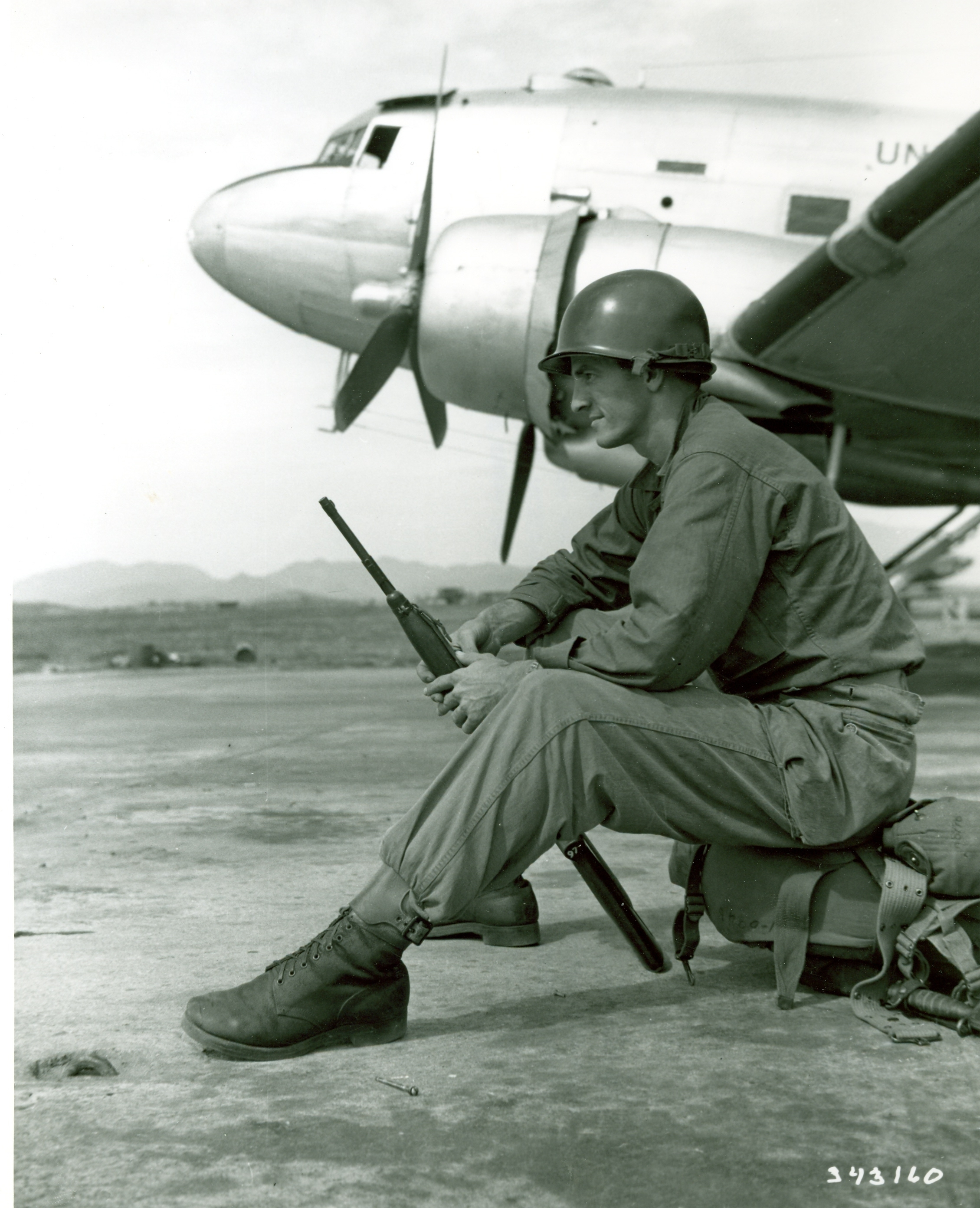
A soldier of the 24th Infantry Division waits to board a plane bound for Korea in 1950.

Five days later, on 30 June, a 406-man infantry force from 1st Battalion, 21st Infantry Regiment, supported by a 134-man artillery battery (also from the 24th Infantry Division) was sent into South Korea. The force, nicknamed Task Force Smith for its commander, Lieutenant Colonel Charles Bradford Smith, was lightly armed and ordered to delay the advance of KPA forces while the rest of the 24th Infantry Division moved into South Korea. On 4 July, the task force set up in the hills north of Osan and prepared to block advancing KPA forces. The next day, they spotted an incoming column of troops from the KPA 105th Armored Division. The ensuing battle was a rout, as the Task Force's obsolescent anti-tank weapons and understrength units were no match for the KPA's T-34 tanks and full-strength formations. Within a few hours, the first battle between American and North Korean forces was lost. Task Force Smith suffered 20 killed and 130 wounded in action. Dozens of US soldiers were captured, and when US forces retook the area, some of the prisoners were discovered to have been executed. According to recently declassified documents the troops were captured and taken to Pyongyang where they are thought to have been murdered about three months later.

Approximately 30 percent of Task Force Smith became casualties in the Battle of Osan. The task force delayed the KPA advance for only seven hours.

==== Pusan Perimeter ====
The rest of the 24th Infantry Division arrived in South Korea, through the port of Pusan, followed by elements of the 1st Cavalry Division and 25th Infantry Division from the Eighth Army. As more soldiers arrived, the 24th Infantry Division was placed under the command of I Corps, Eighth Army. For the first month after the defeat of Task Force Smith, 24th Infantry Division soldiers were repeatedly defeated and pushed south by the KPA's superior numbers and equipment. 24th Infantry Division soldiers were pushed south at and around Chochiwon, Chonan, Pyongtaek, Hadong and Yechon. The division's 19th and 34th Regiments engaged the KPA 3rd and the 4th Infantry Divisions at the Kum River between 13 and 16 July and suffered 650 casualties of the 3,401 men committed there. On 19 and 20 July, the KPA divisions attacked the 24th Infantry Division's headquarters in Taejon and overran it in the Battle of Taejon. In the ensuing battle, 922 men of the 24th Infantry Division were killed and 228 were wounded of 3,933 committed there. Many soldiers were missing in action, including the division commander, Major General William F. Dean, who was captured and later awarded the Medal of Honor. On 1 August, the 24th Division's 19th Infantry Regiment engaged KPA forces and was again forced back, losing 90 killed. KPA officers at the battle claimed that some US soldiers were "too frightened to fight." However, the 24th Infantry Division managed to delay the advancing North Koreans for two days, long enough for significant numbers of UN forces to arrive in Pusan and begin establishing defenses further south. By the time the 24th Infantry Division retreated and reformed, the 1st Cavalry Division was in place behind it. The division suffered over 3,600 casualties in the 17 days it fought alone against the KPA 3rd and 4th Divisions.

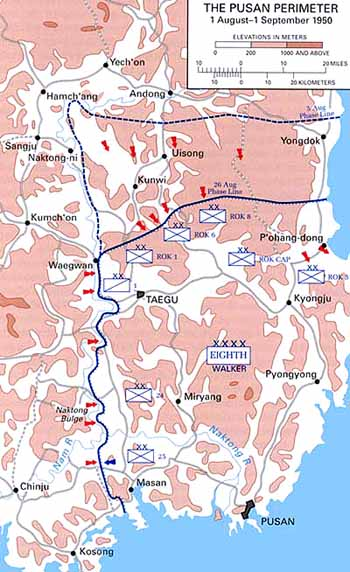
The Pusan Perimeter in August 1950. The 24th Infantry Division held a position on the western line.

By 4 August, a perimeter was established around Pusan on the hills to the north of the city and the Naktong River to the west. The Eighth Army, including the 24th Infantry Division, was cornered by the surrounding KPA. UN forces were now concentrated, the 24th Division was at Naktong, with the 25th Infantry Division to the south, and the 1st Cavalry Division and ROK forces to the north. The 24th Division was also reinforced by the 2nd Infantry Division, newly arrived in the theater. The 24th was quickly sent to block the KPA 6th Infantry Division, which attempted to attack the UN forces from the southwest. On 8 August, the KPA 4th Infantry Division crossed the river and attempted to penetrate the perimeter. After 10 days of fighting, the 24th Infantry Division counterattacked and forced the North Koreans back across the river. By late August 1950, only 184 of the 34th Regiment's original 1,898 men remained. The regiment was dissolved and was replaced within the 24th by the 5th Regimental Combat Team. The 34th Regiment's survivors were added to the ranks of the 19th and 21st Regiments in an effort to bring them up to strength and the 5th Infantry remained with the 24th Division until the division withdrew from Korea. Elements of the 24th Infantry Division were moved into reserve on 23 August and replaced by the 2nd Infantry Division. A second, larger KPA attack occurred between 31 August and 19 September, but the 2nd, 24th, and 25th Infantry Divisions and the 1st Cavalry Division beat them back across the river again.

At the same time, X Corps, with the 7th Infantry Division and 1st Marine Division, attacked Inchon, striking the KPA from the rear. The attack routed the surprised North Koreans, and starting on 16 September, the Eighth Army broke out of the Pusan Perimeter and then began a general counteroffensive northwards. The 24th Infantry Division advanced to Songju, then to Seoul. The Army advanced north along the west coast of Korea through October. By mid-October, the KPA had been almost completely destroyed, and US President Harry S. Truman ordered General MacArthur to advance into North Korea as quickly as possible to end the war. The 24th Infantry Division, with the ROK 1st Infantry Division, moved to the left flank of the advancing Eighth Army, and moved north along Korea's west coast. The 24th Division then moved north to Chongju. The Chinese People's Volunteer Army (PVA) entered the war on the side of North Korea, making their first attacks in late October. On 1 November, the division's 21st Infantry captured Chonggodo, 18 miles (29 km) from the Yalu River and Korea's border with China. Units of the Eighth Army and X Corps spread out as they attempted to reach the Yalu and complete the conquest of North Korea as quickly as possible.

==== Chinese intervention ====
The UN forces renewed their offensive on 24 November before being stopped by the PVA Second Phase Offensive starting on 25 November. The 24th Infantry Division, on the west coast of the Korean peninsula, was hit by soldiers from the PVA 50th and 66th Field Armies. Amid heavy casualties, the Eighth Army retreated from North Korea to the Imjin River, south of the 38th Parallel, having been destabilised by the overwhelming PVA force.

On 1 January 1951, 500,000 PVA troops attacked the Eighth Army's line at the Imjin River, forcing it back 50 miles (80 km) and allowing the Chinese to capture Seoul. The 24th Infantry Division was then reassigned to IX Corps to replace the 2nd and 25th Infantry Divisions, which had been placed in reserve due to heavy losses. The Chinese eventually advanced too far for their supply lines to adequately support them, and their attack stalled.

==== Stalemate ====
General Matthew B. Ridgway ordered I, IX and X Corps to conduct a general counteroffensive on the Chinese (Operation Thunderbolt) quickly thereafter. The 24th Division, as part of IX Corps, advanced along the center of the peninsula to take Chipyong-ni. The corps ran into heavy resistance and fought for the region until February. Between February and March 1951, the 24th Infantry Division participated in Operation Killer, pushing PVA forces north of the Han River. This operation was followed by Operation Ripper, which recaptured Seoul in March. After this, Operation Rugged and Operation Dauntless in April saw the division advance north of the 38th Parallel and reestablish itself along previously established lines of defense, code named Kansas and Utah, respectively.

In late April, the PVA launched a major counterattack. Though the 24th and 25th Infantry Divisions were able to hold their ground against the PVA 9th Army Corps, the ROK 6th Infantry Division, to the east, was destroyed by the PVA 13th Army Corps, which penetrated the line and threatened to encircle the 24th and 25th Divisions. The 1st Marine Division and 27th British Commonwealth Brigade were able to drive the 13th Army Corps back while the 24th and 25th Divisions withdrew on 25 April. The UN forces' line was moved back to Seoul but managed to hold. In May-June the UN launched another counteroffensive erasing most of the PVA gains. In September, the UN forces launched another counteroffensive with the 24th Infantry Division at the center of the line, west of the Hwachon Reservoir. Flanked by the ROK 2nd and 6th Divisions, the 24th advanced past Kumwha, engaging the PVA 20th and 27th Armies. In November, the PVA attempted to counter this attack but were unsuccessful. It was at this point, after several successive counteroffensives that saw both sides fighting intensely over the same ground, that the two sides started serious peace negotiations.

In January 1952, the 24th Infantry Division, which suffered over 10,000 casualties in 18 months of fighting, was redesignated as the Far East Theater reserve and pulled out of Korea. It returned to Japan to rebuild. The 34th Infantry Regiment was reconstituted, and the division returned to full strength during the next year, having been replaced in Korea by the 40th Infantry Division of the California Army National Guard. In July 1953, the division returned to Korea to restore order at Geoje prisoner of war camp. It arrived two weeks before the end of the war.

During the war, 10 soldiers of the division were awarded the Medal of Honor. They were William F. Dean, George D. Libby, Melvin O. Handrich, Mitchell Red Cloud Jr., Carl H. Dodd, Nelson V. Brittin, Ray E. Duke, Stanley T. Adams, Mack A. Jordan, and Woodrow W. Keeble. Keeble's medal was awarded on 3 March 2008, 26 years after his death. The 24th Infantry Division suffered 3,735 killed and 7,395 wounded during the Korean War. It remained on front-line duty after the armistice until October 1957, patrolling the 38th parallel in the event that combat would resume. The division then returned to Japan and remained there for a short time.

=== Cold War ===
On 1 July 1958 the division was relocated to Augsburg, West Germany, replacing the 11th Airborne Division in a reflagging ceremony. The 24th was organized under the Pentomic Division TO&E, in which its combat forces were organized into five oversized battalions (called "battle groups") with no intermediate brigade or regimental headquarters. Although considered an infantry division, the 24th included two airborne battle groups for several months. The 1st Airborne Battle Group, 503rd Infantry left the division for reassignment to the 82nd Airborne Division at Fort Bragg on 7 January 1959 and the 1st Airborne Battle Group, 187th Infantry departed on 8 February 1959, also for the 82nd.

On 13 July, less than 2 weeks after the reorganization, King Faisal II of Iraq was assassinated in a coup orchestrated by pro-Egyptian officers. The Christian president of Lebanon, pressured by Muslims to join Egypt and Syria in the Gamal Abdel Nasser-led United Arab Republic, requested help from the Eisenhower administration during the 1958 Lebanon crisis.

On the night of 15 July, U.S. Marines from the Sixth Fleet landed at Beirut and secured the Beirut airport. The following day, the 24th Division's 1st Airborne Battle Group, 187th Infantry deployed to Turkey and flew to Beirut on 19 July. They were joined by a medium tank battalion and support units, which assisted the Marines in forming a security cordon around the city. The force stayed until late October, providing security, making shows of force, including parachute jumps, and training the Lebanese Army. When factions of the Lebanese government worked out a political settlement, they left. The 24th Division's 1/187th lost one soldier killed by a sniper.

The 24th came into international press focus in 1961 when its commanding general, Major General Edwin Walker, was removed from command for making "derogatory remarks of a serious nature about certain prominent Americans ... which linked the persons and institutions with Communism and Communist influence". The inquiry was sparked by Walker's "Pro Blue" program and accusations Walker and his Information Officer, Lieutenant Colonel Archibald Roberts, distributed John Birch Society literature as troop information in the 24th.

After the construction of the Berlin Wall in August 1961, the Seventh Army began sending infantry units from the divisions in West Germany on a rotating basis to reinforce the Berlin Brigade. The 24th Division's units participated in this action.

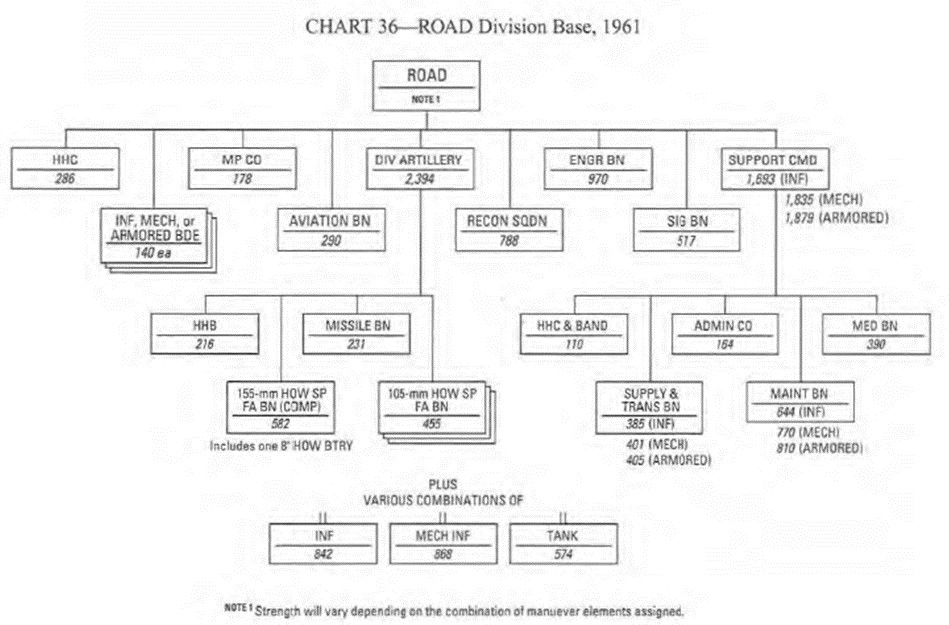
Standard organization chart for a ROAD division

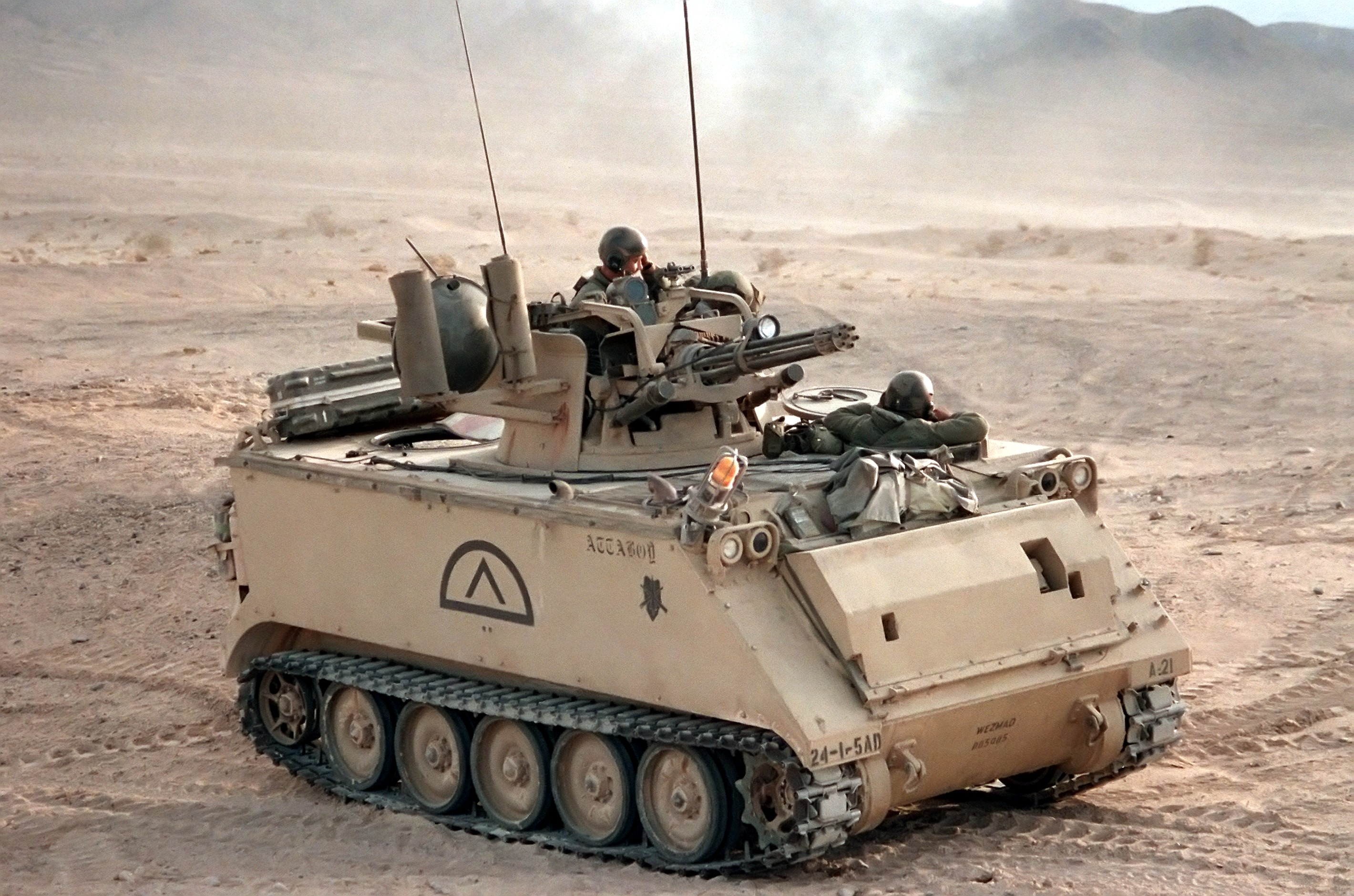
A M163 VADS of the 24th Infantry Division during an exercise in 1988

In January 1963, the 24th was reorganized as a mechanized infantry division under the Reorganization Objective Army Division (ROAD) TO&E, which replaced the pentomic battle groups with conventional-sized battalions organized in three combined arms brigades. The 169th Infantry Brigade, previously assigned to the 85th Infantry Division was redesignated the 1st Brigade, 24th Infantry Division. The 85th Division's 170th Infantry Brigade was redesignated the 2nd Brigade, 24th Infantry Division. The 190th Infantry Brigade, previously assigned to the 95th Infantry Division, became the division's 3rd Brigade. In 1965, the 24th Infantry Division received its distinctive unit insignia.

The 24th remained in Germany, specifically Augsburg, Bavaria until September 1968, when it redeployed its 1st and 2nd Brigades to Fort Riley, Kansas, as part of Exercise Reforger while the division's 3rd Brigade was maintained in Germany. As the US Army withdrew from Vietnam and reduced its forces, the 24th Infantry Division and its three brigades were inactivated on 15 April 1970 at Fort Riley.

In September 1975, the 24th Infantry Division was reactivated at Fort Stewart, Georgia, as part of the program to build a 16-division US Army force. Because the Regular Army could not field a full division at Fort Stewart, the 24th had the 48th Infantry Brigade of the Georgia Army National Guard assigned to it as a round-out unit in place of its 3rd Brigade. Targeted for a North Atlantic Treaty Organization (NATO) role, the 24th Division was reorganized as a mechanized division in 1979.

Under then-Major General John Galvin, the division was earmarked to join the U.S. Army's component of the Rapid Deployment Joint Task Force, the XVIII Airborne Corps. Galvin wrote years later that the 'logistical problems [involved in Middle East deployments] were tougher than anything I had ever encountered in my time in seven different divisions.' (Galvin 2015, 267). 'We went immediately to barcoding, minicomputers, and every innovation we could find to improve supply procedures and keep [the] division moving.' (Galvin, Fighting the Cold War, 2015, 267–8). The 24th ID eventually reequipped with new M1 Abrams tanks and M2 Bradley Fighting Vehicles, that formed the core of the U.S. Army's heavily armored mechanized force for the 15 years that followed.

=== Gulf War ===
==== Desert Shield ====
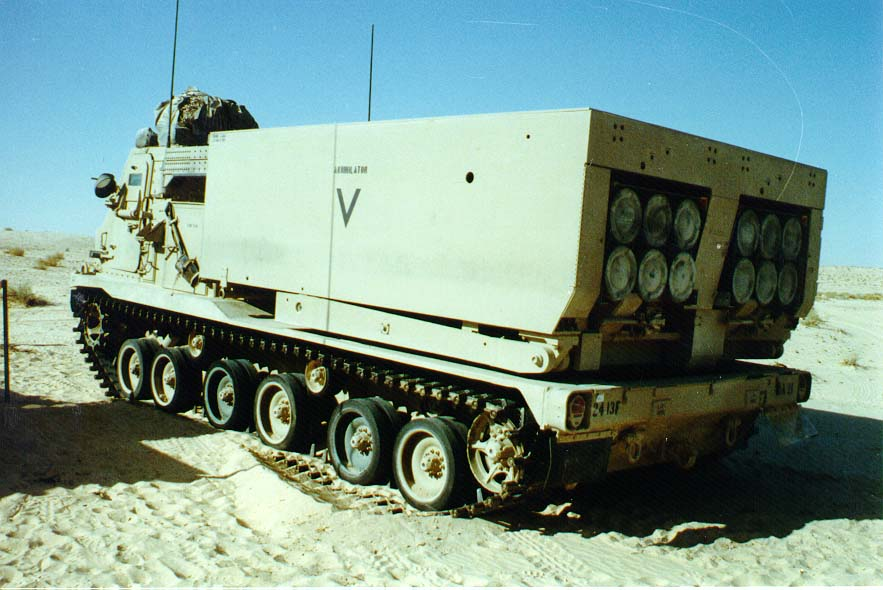
An M270 MLRS of A Battery, 13th FA Regiment, 24th ID during Desert Shield

When President George H. W. Bush decided to send troops to Saudi Arabia after the Invasion of Kuwait in 1990, the division, as part of the XVIII Airborne Corps, was one of the first formations deployed to the Middle East. It arrived in 10 large cargo ships of the Military Sealift Command. Advance elements of the 24th Division began arriving in Saudi Arabia on 17 August. Some controversy erupted when the division's round-out formation, the 48th Infantry Brigade (Mechanized), of the Georgia National Guard, was not sent overseas. Army leaders decided that the use of National Guard forces was unnecessary, as they felt the active-duty force had sufficient troops. The 48th Brigade was replaced once the 24th Division was in Saudi Arabia with the regular Army's 197th Infantry Brigade (Mechanized). The 24th Division was then assigned to XVIII Airborne Corps as the corps' heavy-armored division.

In the months that followed, the 24th Division played an important part of Operation Desert Shield by providing heavy firepower with its large number of armored vehicles, including 216 M1A1 Abrams tanks. Elements of the division were still arriving in September, and in the logistical chaos that followed the rapid arrival of U.S. forces in the region, the soldiers of the 24th Division were housed in warehouses, airport hangars, and on the desert sand. The 24th remained in relatively stationary positions in defense of Saudi Arabia until additional American forces arrived for Operation Desert Storm. Aviation units of the division included 2nd Squadron, 4th Cavalry, and 1st Battalion, 24th Aviation Regiment.

24th Infantry Division (Mech)
MG Barry McCaffrey

1st Brigade

4th BN, 64th Armor Regiment
2nd BN, 7th Infantry Regiment (Mech)
3rd BN, 7th Infantry Regiment (Mech)
1st BN, 41st Field Artillery Regiment (155SP)

2nd Brigade

1st BN, 64th Armor Regiment
3rd BN, 69th Armor Regiment
3rd BN, 15th Infantry Regiment (Mech)
3rd BN, 41st Field Artillery Regiment (155SP)

197th Infantry Brigade (Mech) – Acting 3rd Brigade

2nd BN, 69th Armor Regiment
1st BN, 18th Infantry Regiment (Mech)
2nd BN, 18th Infantry Regiment (Mech)
4th BN, 41st Field Artillery Regiment(155SP)

==== Desert Storm ====
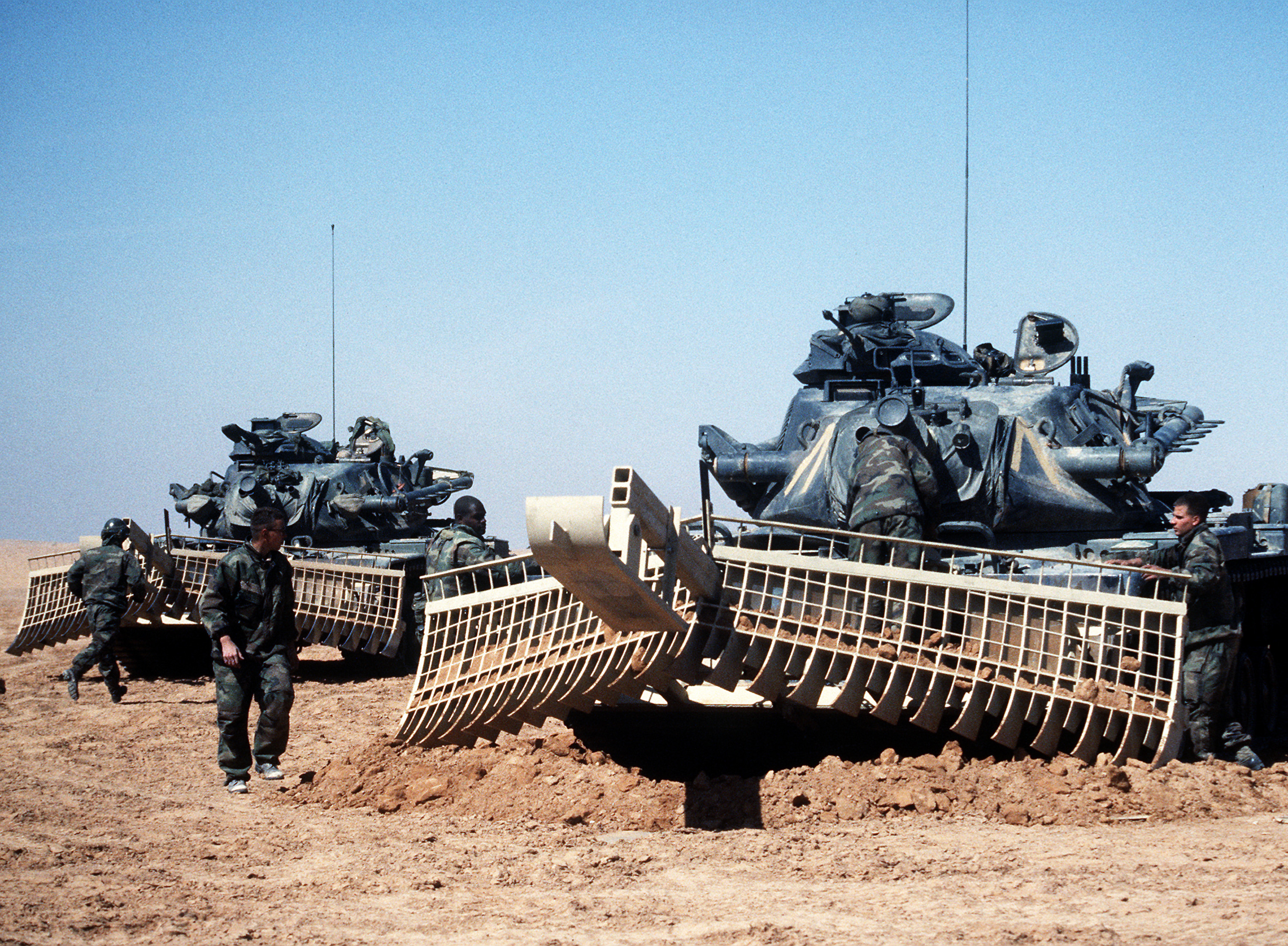
Division engineers test mine-clearing gear before Desert Storm.

Ground operations during Operation Desert Storm, with the 24th Infantry Division positioned at the left flank

Operation Desert Storm began with an extensive aerial bombing campaign on 17 January 1991. When the ground attack began on 24 February, the 24th Infantry Division formed the east flank of the corps with the 3rd Armored Cavalry Regiment. It blocked the Euphrates River valley to cut off Iraqi forces in Kuwait, meeting little resistance. The 24th Division's ranks had swelled to over 25,000 troops in 34 battalions, including 94 helicopters, 241 M1 Abrams tanks, 221 M2 Bradley Armored fighting vehicles, and over 7,800 other vehicles. The 24th Infantry Division performed well, the result of several years of training in desert warfare. On 26 February, the 24th Division advanced through the valley and captured Iraqi airfields at the Battle for Jalibah Airfield and Tallil. At the airfields, it encountered entrenched resistance from the Iraqi 37th and 49th Infantry Divisions, as well as the 6th Nebuchadnezzar Mechanized Division of the Iraqi Republican Guard. Despite some of the fiercest resistance of the war, the 24th Infantry Division destroyed the Iraqi formations and captured the two airfields the next day. The 24th then moved east with VII Corps and engaged several Iraqi Republican Guard divisions. The 24th Infantry Division's Task Force Tusker attacked entrenched Iraqi forces on 26 February 1991 to seize battle position 143, severing the Iraqi Euphrates River Valley line of communication to the Kuwait Theater of operation and destroying the major combat elements of the Iraqi Republican Guard Forces Command's elite 26th Commando Brigade.

On 2 March 1991, well after the ceasefire, the 24th Infantry Division fought in the Battle of Rumaila, a controversial engagement against the Republican Guard's Hammurabi Division. Republican Guard forces were fighting in the Hammar Marshes of the Tigris–Euphrates river system in Iraq while attempting to reach and cross the Lake Hammar causeway and escape north toward Baghdad on Highway 8. The Iraqi caravan of several hundred vehicles stretched for five miles. Most were boxed into a kill zone and, over five hours, systematically devastated by the 24th Infantry Division's armored forces, AH-64 Apache attack helicopters, and artillery. Nine artillery battalions fired thousands of rounds and rockets. At least six Hammurabi Republican Guard battalions were destroyed.

The 1st Bn., 24th Aviation Regiment destroyed 32 Iraqi tanks, 49 BMPs, 37 trucks, 8 Frog Missile launchers, numerous other assorted artillery pieces, anti-aircraft guns, and support vehicles. The aerial attack assured the destruction of the Republican Guard Forces Hammurabi Division and the remnants of several other infantry divisions. Four companies within 1st Battalion, 24th Aviation Regiment would be awarded Valorous Unit Award Citations.

General Barry McCaffrey reported the elimination of 247 tanks and armored fighting vehicles, 43 artillery pieces, and over 400 trucks. About 3,000 Iraqi soldiers were captured. The battle was one-sided and Iraqi attempts to return fire proved almost completely ineffective. Just one U.S. soldier was injured and two U.S. armored vehicles were lost (an M2 Bradley infantry fighting vehicle damaged by enemy fire and an M1 Abrams tank set on fire by a nearby explosion of an Iraqi truck). A hospital bus with medics and wounded Iraqi soldiers who had already surrendered to another American platoon was also destroyed by gunfire, which later troubled many U.S. soldiers. Surviving Iraqi soldiers were either taken prisoner, fled on foot or swam to safety.

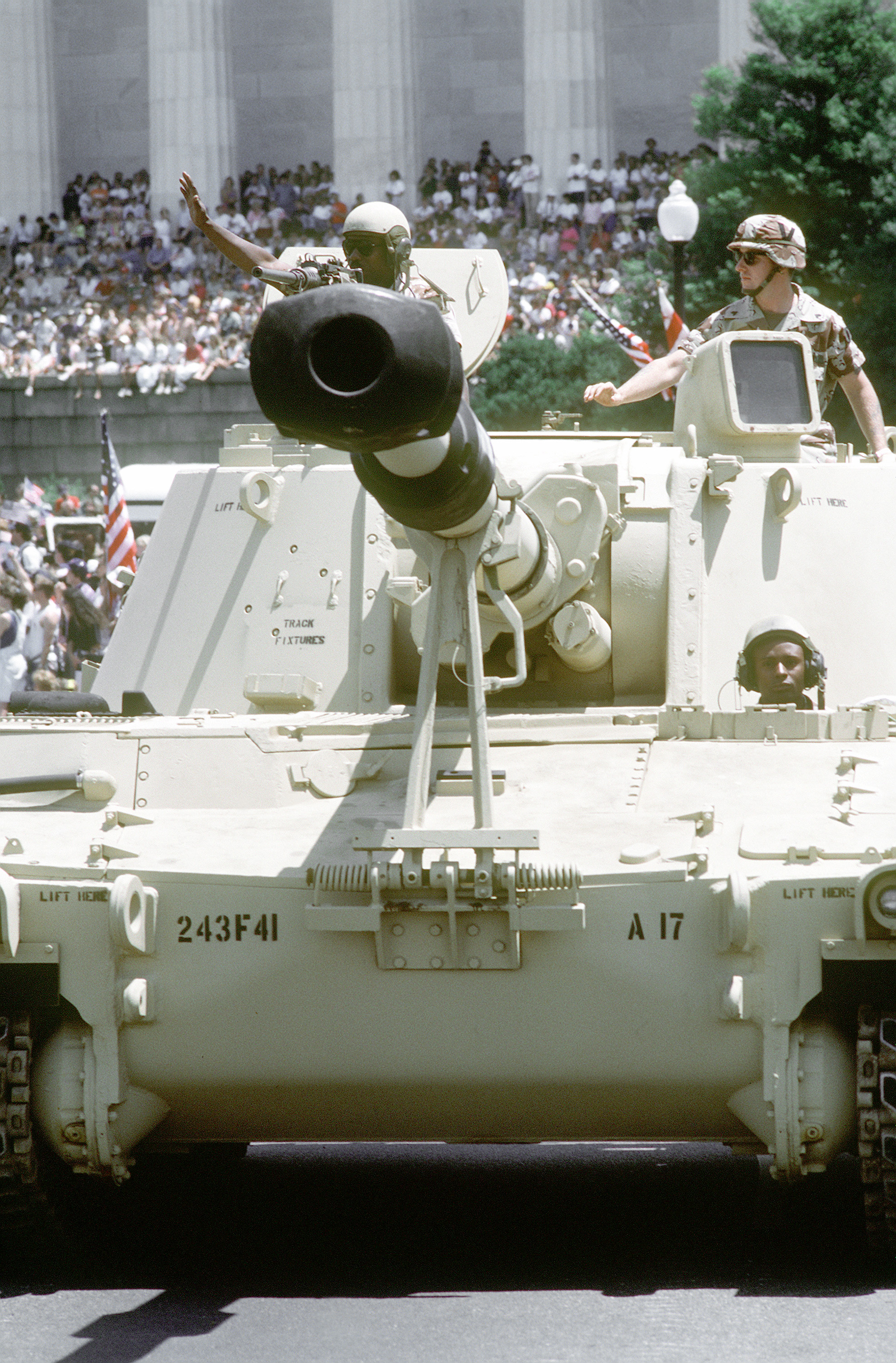
24th Infantry Division M109A2 155mm self-propelled howitzer at National Victory Celebration

After the Iraqi forces were defeated, the U.N. required the U.S. to withdraw from Iraq, ending the Gulf War. By the end of combat operations, the 24th Infantry Division advanced 260 miles and destroyed 360 tanks and other armored personnel carriers, 300 artillery pieces, 1,200 trucks, 25 aircraft, 19 missiles, and over 500 pieces of engineer equipment. The division took over 5,000 Iraqi prisoners of war while suffering only eight killed, 36 wounded, and five non-combat casualties.

After returning to the United States in spring 1991, the 24th was reorganized with two brigades at Fort Stewart and the 3rd Brigade reactivated at Fort Benning, Georgia, replacing the 197th Infantry Brigade. In fall 1994, Iraq again threatened the Kuwaiti border, and two brigades from the division returned to southwest Asia. As part of the Army's reduction to a ten-division force, the 24th Infantry Division was inactivated on 15 February 1996 and reflagged to become the 3rd Infantry Division. Its three brigades were reflagged as 3rd Infantry Division brigades.

=== Training command ===
In the wake of the Cold War, the US Army considered new options for the integration and organization of active duty, Army Reserve and Army National Guard units in training and deployment. Two active duty division headquarters were activated for training National Guard units; those of the 7th Infantry Division and the 24th Infantry Division. The subordinate brigades of the divisions did not activate, so they could not be deployed as combat divisions. Instead, the headquarters units focused on full-time training.

On 5 June 1999 the 24th Infantry Division was reactivated, this time at Fort Riley, Kansas. From 1999 to 2006, the 24th Infantry Division consisted of a headquarters and three separate National Guard brigades; the 30th Heavy Brigade Combat Team at Clinton, North Carolina, the 218th Heavy Brigade Combat Team at Columbia, South Carolina, and the 48th Infantry Brigade Combat Team in Macon, Georgia. The division headquarters was responsible for the Guard brigades should they be called to active duty in wartime. This never occurred, as each brigade deployed individually. The division's final operations included preparing Fort Riley for the return of the 1st Infantry Division, which was stationed in Germany.

To expand upon the concept of Reserve component and National Guard components, the First Army activated Division East and Division West, two commands responsible for reserve units' readiness and mobilization exercises. Division East activated at Fort George Meade Maryland. This transformation was part of an overall restructuring of the US Army to streamline the organizations overseeing training. Division East took control of reserve units in states east of the Mississippi River, eliminating the need for the 24th Infantry Division headquarters. As such, the 24th Infantry Division was again inactivated on 1 August 2006 at Fort Riley.

=== Inactivation ===
Though it was inactivated, the division was initially identified as the third highest priority inactive division in the United States Army Center of Military History's lineage scheme due to its numerous accolades and long history. All of the division's flags and heraldic items were moved to the National Infantry Museum at Fort Benning, Georgia following its inactivation. Should the U.S. Army decide to activate more divisions in the future following the activation of the 7th Infantry Division in 2012, the center will most likely suggest the first new division be the 9th Infantry Division, the second be the 24th Infantry Division, the third be the 5th Infantry Division, and the fourth be the 2nd Armored Division.

== Honors ==
The 24th Infantry Division was awarded five campaign streamers and one unit decoration in World War II, eight campaign streamers and three unit decorations in the Korean War, two campaign streamers for the Gulf War, and one unit award in peacetime, for a total of fifteen campaign streamers and five unit decorations in its operational history.

=== Unit decorations ===
| Ribbon | Award | Year | Notes |
|---|---|---|---|
| Vertical tricolor ribbon (blue, white, red) with gold border | Philippine Republic Presidential Unit Citation | 1944–45 | for service in the Philippines during World War II |
| Dark blue ribbon with a gold border | Presidential Unit Citation (Army) | 1950 | for fighting in the Pusan Perimeter |
| White ribbon with vertical green and red stripes on its edges and a red and blue circle in the middle | Republic of Korea Presidential Unit Citation | 1950 | for service in Pyeongtaek |
| | Republic of Korea Presidential Unit Citation | 1952–53 | for service in Korea |
| A red ribbon with a vertical green stripe running down the center | Superior Unit Award | 1994 | |

=== Campaign streamers ===
| Conflict | Streamer | Year(s) |
|---|---|---|
| World War II | Central Pacific | 1943 |
| World War II | New Guinea (with Arrowhead) | 1944 |
| World War II | Leyte (with Arrowhead) | 1945 |
| World War II | Luzon | 1945 |
| World War II | Southern Philippines (with Arrowhead) | 1945 |
| Korean War | UN Defensive | 1950 |
| Korean War | UN Offensive | 1950 |
| Korean War | CCF Intervention | 1950 |
| Korean War | First UN Counteroffensive | 1950 |
| Korean War | CCF Spring Offensive | 1951 |
| Korean War | UN Summer-Fall Offensive | 1951 |
| Korean War | Second Korean Winter | 1951–1952 |
| Korean War | Korea, Summer 1953 | 1953 |
| Gulf War | Defense of Saudi Arabia | 1991 |
| Gulf War | Liberation and Defense of Kuwait | 1991 |

== See also ==
- List of Commanders of 24th Infantry Division
