= Right-wing antiglobalism =

Ethno-nationalist political stance

Anti–Sustainable Development Goals symbol used by right-wing antiglobalists

Right-wing antiglobalism, also referred to as the antiglobalist right, is a political ideology opposing globalism. The term globalist is associated with antisemitic conspiracy theories, especially the New World Order conspiracy theory, and refers to a group of people with an economic and political interest in globalization. The term has also been linked to the new antisemitism movement; although certain right-wing antiglobalist leaders, such as Donald Trump and Javier Milei, also hold pro-Israel positions.

Right-wing antiglobalists consider the United Nations (including its Sustainable Development Goals), 15-minute cities, and COVID-19 vaccines to have been created or promoted by globalists.

== Background ==
From the late 1960s to the early 1980s, Liberty Lobby (and founder Willis Carto) and the John Birch Society, along with associated authors such as Gary Allen and Archibald Roberts, helped shape anti-internationalism into antiglobalism. Their focus on spreading information through publications, such as The Spotlight and American Opinion, helped antiglobalism spread.

Among the Christian right, particularly the Protestant right, globalism is an umbrella term which includes perceived secular aspects such as environmentalism, feminism, and socialism; globalism is believed to underlie the expansion of the New World Order – a prophesied enemy attempting to thwart Christianity – through organizations such as the European Union, United Nations, World Trade Organization, and World Health Organization. These entities are perceived to be at odds with Christian values. UN conventions on discrimination against women and children's rights have thus been fiercely opposed by organizations and leading figures of the Christian right, such as Concerned Women for America, and characterized as attempts to weaken parental rights, destroy the traditional family, and separate children from their religious and familial settings.

The UN as a satanic enemy is a theme in apocalyptic Christian media, such as the 1990s–2000s series Left Behind, in which the UN is run by the Antichrist, as well as Pat Robertson's 1991 New World Order and Hal Lindsey's 1994 book Planet Earth 2000 A.D.: Will Mankind Survive?.

Right-wing antiglobalism began to gain traction in the 2010s in countries like the United Kingdom and the United States, which were previously seen as major supporters of globalization. Before the 21st century, most of the critiques of globalism came from its impact on the Global South and was left-wing in nature. In the 21st century, the concept was recuperated by right-wing figures.

== Common ideas and themes ==
=== Support of national sovereignty over globalism ===
Right-wing anti-globalists often argue that international organizations such as the United Nations override the decision-making power of nation states and thus undermine national sovereignty.

=== Economic nationalism ===
Right-wing anti-globalists often favor protectionist economic policy over free-trade neoliberal free-market approaches to protect domestic industries, labor, and small businesses from foreign competition.

=== National identity and nativism ===
Many right-wing populist movements who express nationalist views argue that globalization fuels multiculturalism and mass migration which they argue dilute national culture, traditions, and identity.

=== Allegations of antisemitism ===
Followers of the QAnon conspiracy theory refer to what they term "the cabal" as a secret worldwide elite organization that wishes to undermine democracy and freedom and implement their globalist agendas. Hungary's former prime minister Viktor Orbán has used antisemitic tropes in accusations against globalists, espousing a conspiracy theory of a world network controlled by Hungarian-American billionaire George Soros. During the election and presidency of United States president Donald Trump, he and members of his administration used the term globalist on multiple occasions. The administration was accused of using the term as an antisemitic dog whistle, and to associate their critics with an international Jewish conspiracy.

== See also ==
- Christian fundamentalism and conspiracy theories
- Criticism of the United Nations
- Cultural Marxism conspiracy theory
- Ethnic nationalism
- Euroscepticism
- George Soros conspiracy theories
- Liberal elite
- Left-wing antiglobalism
- Opposition to immigration
- Proposals for the United States to withdraw from the United Nations
- Right-wing populism
- Triple parentheses
- Trumpism
- United States withdrawal from the Paris Agreement
- White nationalism
