= 169th Brigade =

169th Brigade may refer to:

United Kingdom

- 169th (3rd London) Brigade

United States

- 169th Field Artillery Brigade
- 169th Infantry Brigade (United States)

== See also ==
- 169th Regiment (disambiguation)
