= Jalibah Southeast Air Base =

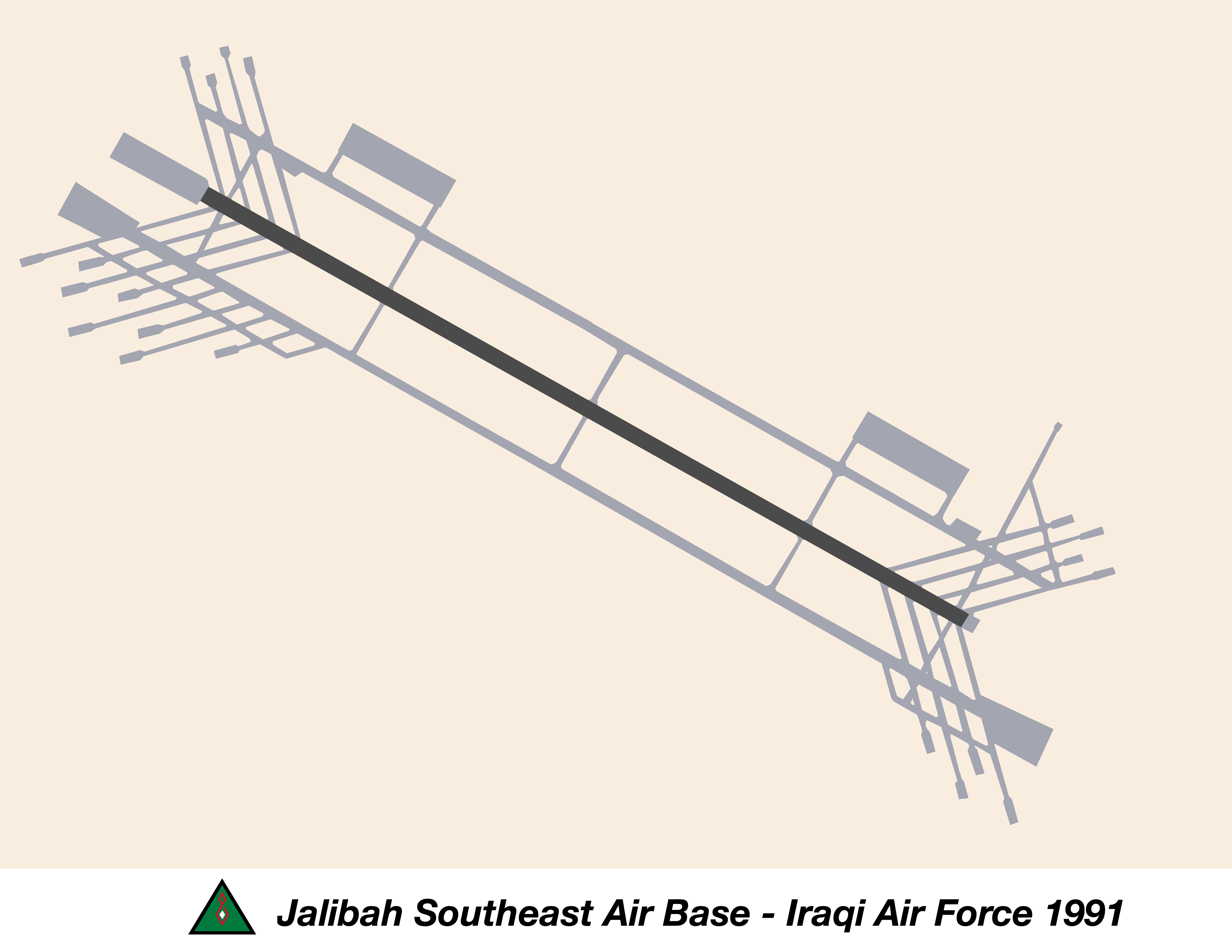
- IATA: none; ICAO: none

Summary
- Airport type: Military
- Owner/Operator: Iraqi Air Force
- Location: 370 km (230 mi) southeast of Baghdad, Iraq
- In use: Military use
- Elevation AMSL: 105 ft / 32 m
- Coordinates: 30°32′29″N 046°36′04″E

Map
- Location in Iraq

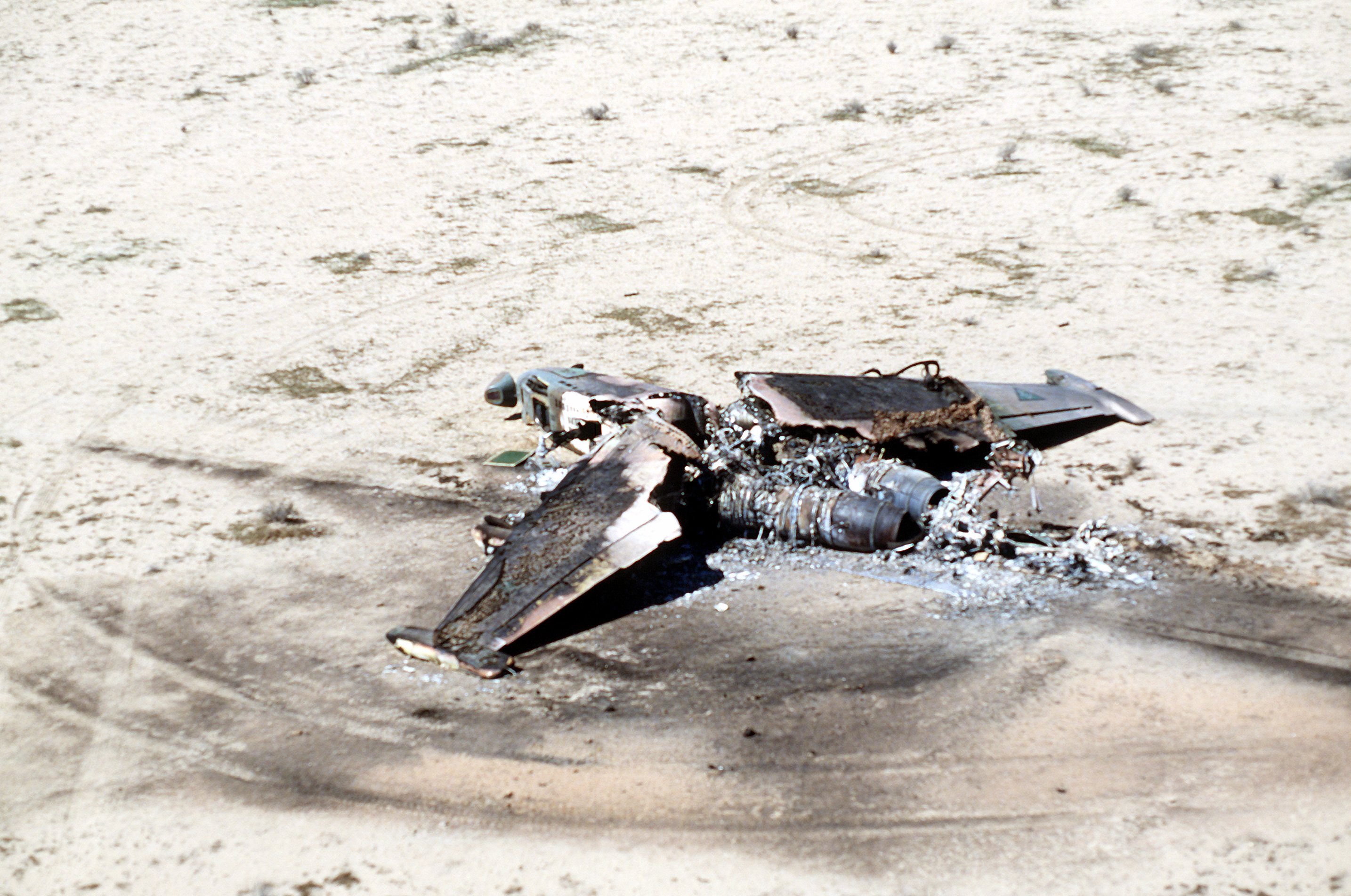
An Iraqi Air Force Su-25K Frogfoot-A destroyed during the Battle for Jalibah Air Base.

Jalibah Southeast Air Base or Jalibah Air Base was a former military airport of the Iraqi Air Force. It is located around 370 km (230 mi) southeast of Baghdad. According to a report by the RAF, it had a main runway and two parallel taxiways as well as hardened air shelters (HAS) on each corner of the base.

== History ==
=== Operation Desert Storm - Air War phase ===
During the early days of the war, the RAF identified Jalibah as a Main Operating Base for Iraqi MiG-23s and MiG-29s. On the morning 18 January 1991, eight RAF Tornados took off from Dhahran to attack Jalibah's runways and HASs with JP233s, with USAF EF-111As and F-4G Wild Weasel aircraft providing SEAD support. Originally, these aircraft was supposed to attack a Scud missile site but the sortie was cancelled due to it being daylight. The No.4 Tornado had to turn back due to mechanical problems while remaining refuelled from a VC-10 tanker and approached the target area. The attack occurred 5:00AM and 5:15AM, with no anti-aircraft fire being encountered until three nmi (5.6 km; 3.5 mi) south from an ammunition dump. Two other aircraft failed to deliver their weapons, including the No.3 aircraft which accidentally dropped its bombs two nautical miles (3.7 km; 2.3 mi) north of the air base although the rest of attack went as planned.

A Muharraq-Bahrain based RAF Tornado strike occurred on the evening of 21 January. This strike was conducted at medium altitude with aircraft using each eight 1,000 pound bombs and was supported by four USAF F-4Gs and two F-15C Eagles. Several SAMs were launched although the RAF pilots concluded that the SAMs were most likely unguided. Several hours later, the first Dhahran RAF Tornado medium level strike occurred on Jalibah, each aircraft carrying five 1,000 pound bombs.

=== Ground War phase ===
Towards the end of the war, the air base was the scene of the battle between the Iraqi Army and the US 2nd Brigade, 24th Infantry Division. On the 27th of February at 6:00AM, the US 2nd Brigade began the attack after an artillery barrage by supporting US Army forces. Among the Iraqi Losses were 20 aircraft (including an Su-25K Frogfoot-A) destroyed on the ground and a tank battalion. Jalibah Southeast Air Base was then captured by the US Army.
