= 1st Brigade, 24th Infantry Division =

- 24th Infantry Division shoulder sleeve insignia
- Active: 1921–70, 1975–96
- Country: United States of America
- Branch: United States Army
- Type: Infantry
- Role: Mechanized infantry
- Size: Brigade

The 1st Brigade, 24th Infantry Division (formerly the 169th Infantry Brigade) was an infantry brigade of the United States Army. Before its most recent deactivation in 2006, it was based at Fort Stewart, Georgia. It was a divisional brigade of the 24th Infantry Division.

== History ==
The brigade traces its lineage back to the 169th Infantry Brigade active as a part of the 85th Infantry Division. The 169th Infantry Brigade was active from 25 February 1921 to 1942, when it was disbanded.

- Headquarters, 169th Brigade
  - 337th Infantry Regiment
  - 338th Infantry Regiment
  - 329th Machine Gun Battalion

=== Cold War ===
In January 1963 the 24th was reorganized as a mechanized infantry division under the Reorganization Objective Army Division (ROAD) TO&E, which replaced the Pentomic battle groups with conventionally sized battalions, organized in three combined arms brigades. The 169th Infantry Brigade, previously assigned to the 85th Infantry Division was redesignated the 1st Brigade, 24th Infantry Division. The 85th Division's 170th Infantry Brigade was redesignated the 2nd Brigade, 24th Infantry Division. The 190th Infantry Brigade, previously assigned to the 95th Infantry Division, became the 3rd Brigade, 24th Infantry Division.

The division remained in Germany (Augsburg, Munich) until September 1968 when it redeployed 1st and 2nd Brigades Fort Riley, Kansas, as part of Exercise REFORGER (Return of Forces to Germany) while 3rd Brigade was maintained in Germany. As the Army withdrew from Vietnam and reduced its forces, the 24th Infantry Division and its three brigades were inactivated on 15 April 1970 at Fort Riley.

On 21 September 1975, the 24th Infantry Division was activated at Fort Stewart, Georgia, as part of the program to build a sixteen-division force. Because the Regular Army could not field a full division at Fort Stewart, the 24th had the 48th Infantry Brigade, Georgia Army National Guard, assigned to it as a round-out unit in place of 3rd Brigade. Targeted for a NATO role, the division was reorganized as a mechanized division in 1979.

=== Gulf War ===
Ground operations during Operation Desert Storm, with the 24th Infantry Division positioned at the left flank.

- HHC, 1st Brigade "Liberty Brigade"
- 2d Battalion, 7th Infantry Regiment
- 3d Battalion, 7th Infantry Regiment
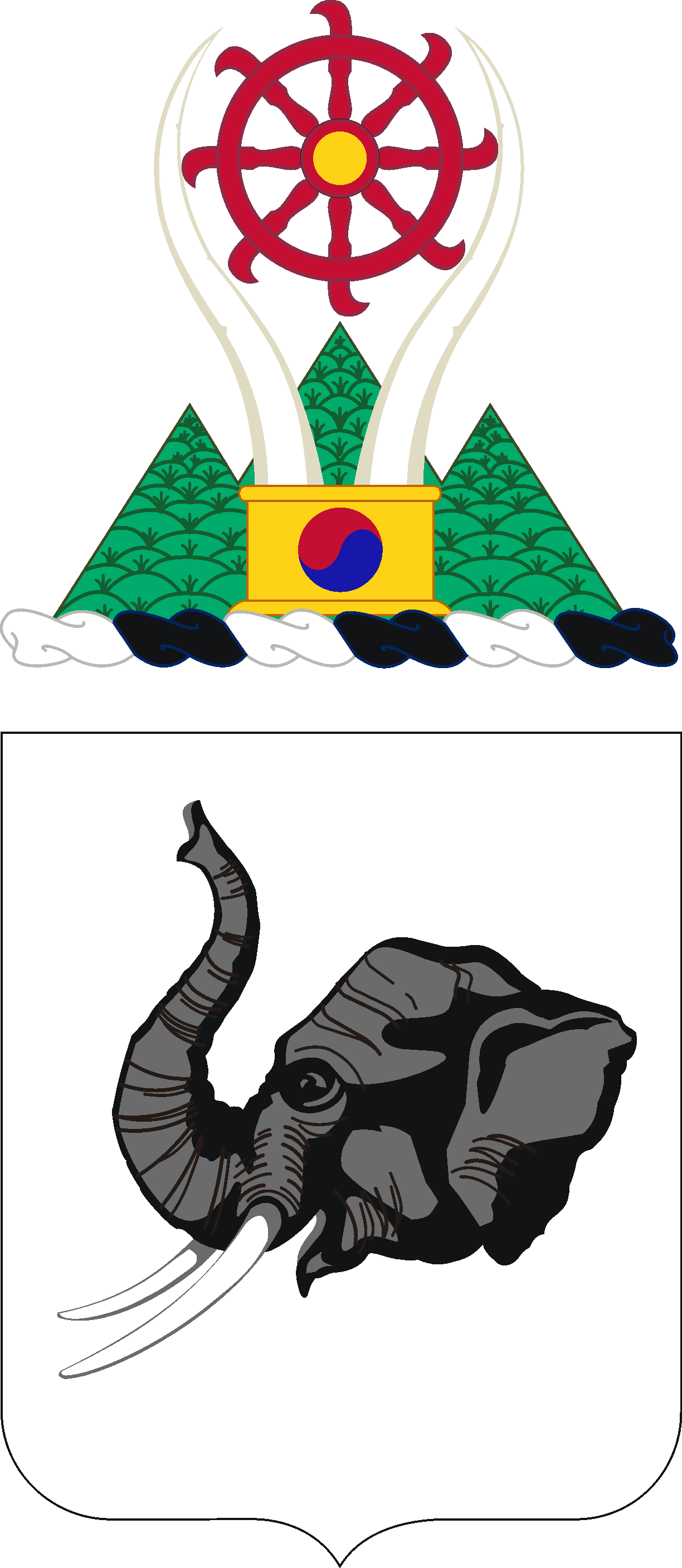
- 4th Battalion, 64th Armor Regiment

The following units reinforced the Brigade during the Gulf War:

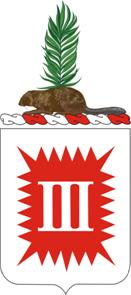
- 3rd Engineer Battalion
- 24th Forward Support Battalion
- Battery A, 1st Battalion, 5th Air Defense Artillery Regiment
- Company A, 24th Signal Battalion
- Company A, 124th Military Intelligence Battalion

When the United Nations decided to intervene in Kuwait in 1990, the 24th which was part of the Rapid Deployment Force, was one of the first units deployed to Southwest Asia. Some controversy erupted when the division's round-out unit, the 48th Infantry Brigade, was found to be unprepared for deployment. The brigade was replaced once the division was in Saudi Arabia with the regular Army 197th Infantry Brigade (Mechanized). The division was assigned to XVIII Airborne Corps and once the attack commenced, the division blocked the Euphrates River valley to cut off Iraqi forces in Kuwait. It then moved east with VII Corps, engaging several Iraqi Republican Guard divisions. At this time, the division ranks swelled to over 25,000 troops in 34 battalions. Iraqi forces defeated, the UN mandated that the US forces withdraw from Iraq, ending the Gulf War.

Returning to the United States in the spring of 1991, the 24th was reorganized with all its elements in the Regular Army, two brigades at Fort Stewart and the 3rd Brigade reactivated at Fort Benning, Georgia, replacing the 197th Infantry Brigade. In the fall of 1994 Iraq again menaced the Kuwaiti border, and two brigades from the division returned to Southwest Asia. As part of the Army's reduction to a ten-division force, the 24th Infantry Division was inactivated on 15 February 1996, and reflagged to become the 3rd Infantry Division. Its three brigades were reflagged as 3rd Infantry Division brigades.

== Sources ==
- McGrath, John J. (2004). The Brigade: A History: Its Organization and Employment in the US Army. Combat Studies Institute Press. ISBN 978-1-4404-4915-4.
