= Camp Caves =

US Army training camp in Queensland, Australia

Coordinates: 23.172°S 150.454°E

Camp Caves was a US Army training camp north of the city of Rockhampton, Queensland, Australia. Built during World War II, the camp was in use from September 1943 until early in 1944. It was one of a number of US training camps in the area including Camp Nerimbera, Camp Thompson's Point, Camp Keppel Sands, Camp Yeppoon and Camp Wallaroo.

Camp Caves was the camp for the 24th Infantry Division, which was also called the Hawaiian Division. It was called Camp Caves after the small town, The Caves, which was close to the campsite. The site was along the side of the Bruce Highway. It included medical services, warehouses, ammunition dumps, landing strips, and a small arms firing range. Work on building the camp began in November 1942 but was soon stopped. It started again in July 1943. The camp was no longer used after March 1944.
