= List of commanders of 24th Infantry Division (United States) =

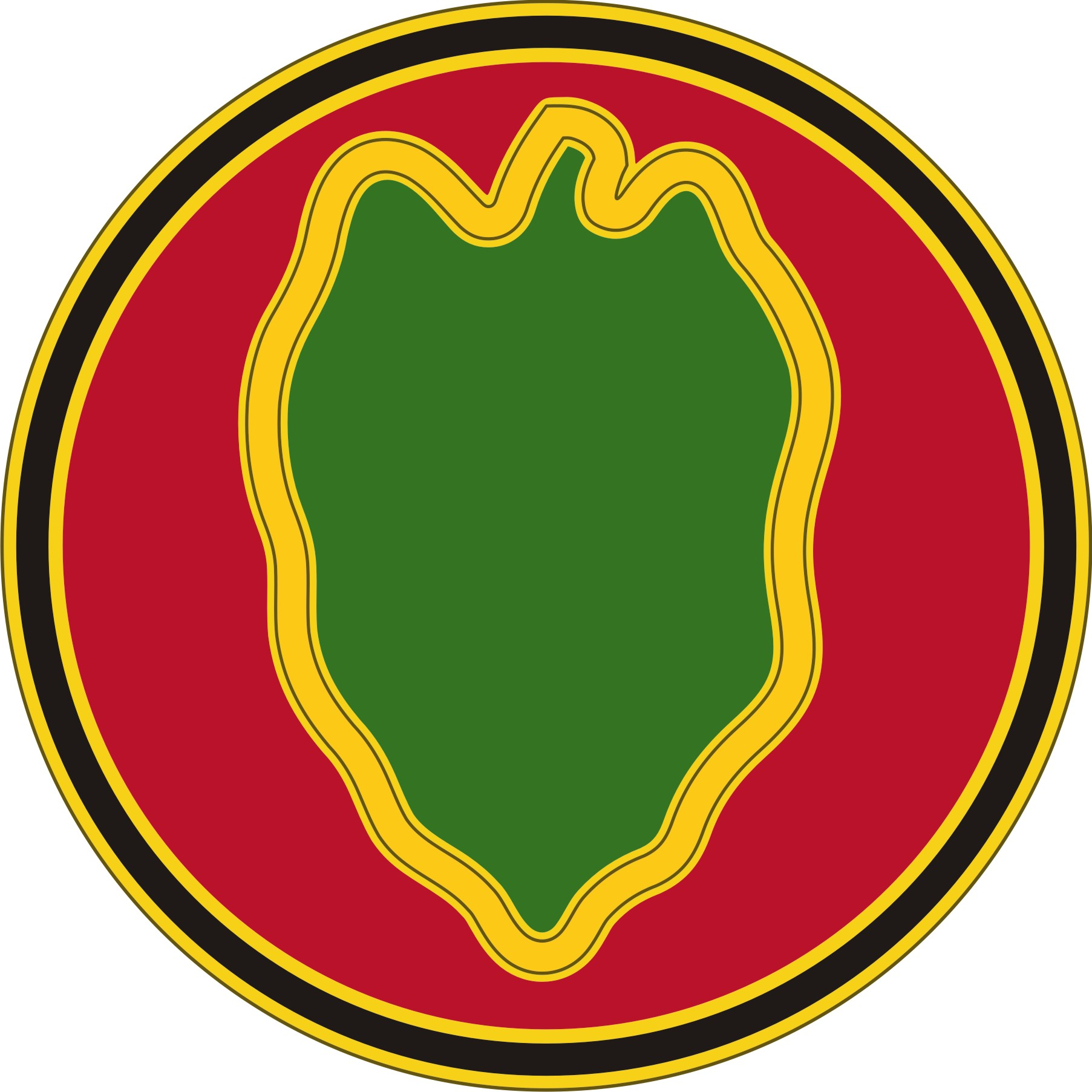
Taro leaf insignia of the 24th Infantry Division

This is a list of commanders of the 24th Infantry Division of the United States Army, which was activated in 1941. It was inactive from 1957 to 1958, 1970 to 1975, 1996 to 1999, and since 2006. The 24th Division's antecedents were known as the Hawaiian Division, which existed from 1921 to 1941.

== Commanders ==
1. MG Durward S. Wilson, October 1941 – July 1942
2. MG Frederick A. Irving, August 1942 – October 1944
3. MG Roscoe B. Woodruff, November 1944 – November 1945
4. BG Kenneth F. Cramer, November 1945 – December 1945
5. MG James A. Lester, December 1945 – January 1948
6. MG Albert C. Smith, January 1948 – April 1949
7. MG Anthony C. McAuliffe, April 1949 - May 1949
8. MG William F. Dean, June 1949 – July 1950
9. MG John H. Church, July 1950 – January 1951
10. MG Blackshear M. Bryan, January 1951 – December 1951
11. MG Henry I. Hodes, January 1952 – February 1952
12. BG Paul D. Adams, February 1952 – March 1952
13. BG George W. Smythe, March 1952 – October 1952
14. BG Wilbur E. Dunkelberg, October 7–30, 1952
15. BG Barksdale Hamlett, October 1952 – November 1952
16. MG Charles L. Dasher Jr., November 1952 – October 1953
17. MG Carter B. Magruder, November 1953 – January 1954
18. BG Carl I. Hutton, January 1954 – February 1954
19. MG Paul D. Harkins, March 1954 – July 1954
20. MG Mark McClure, July 1954 – June 1955
21. MG Stanhope B. Mason, July 1955 – October 1956
22. MG Russell L. Vittrup, October 1956 – April 1957
23. BG Charles H. Bonesteel III, April 1957 – May 1957
24. MG Ralph W. Zwicker, May 1957 – October 1957 (Division Inactive October 1957 – July 1958)
25. MG Ralph C. Cooper, July 1958 – September 1959
26. BG Albert Watson II, September 1959 – October 1959
27. BG Autrey J. Maroun, October 1959 – November 1959
28. MG Edwin A. Walker, November 1959 – April 1961
29. BG Harry J. Lemley Jr., April 1961 – May 1961
30. MG Charles H. Bonesteel III, May 1961 – April 1962
31. MG Benjamin F. Taylor, April 1962 – April 1963
32. BG William A. Enemark, April 1963 – May 1963
33. MG William A. Cunningham III, May 1963 – July 1965
34. MG Edward L. Rowny, July 1965 – September 1966
35. BG Herron M. Maples, September 1966 – October 1966
36. MG Roderick A. Wetherill, October 1966 – August 1968
37. MG Linton S. Boatwright, August 1968 – September 1969
38. MG Robert R. Linville, September 1969 – March 1970 (Division Inactive April 1970 – September 1975)
39. MG Donald E. Rosenblum, September 1975 – September 1977
40. MG James B. Vaught, September 1977 – August 1979
41. MG James F. Cochran III, August 1979 – May 1981
42. MG John R. Galvin, June 1981 – June 1983
43. MG H. Norman Schwarzkopf, June 1983 – June 1985
44. MG Andrew L. Cooley, June 1985 – July 1987
45. MG Michael F. Sprigelmire, July 1987 – September 1988
46. MG Horace G. Taylor, September 1988 – June 1990
47. MG Barry R. McCaffrey, June 1990 – May 1992
48. MG Paul E. Blackwell, May 1992 – June 1994
49. MG Joseph E. DeFrancisco, June 1994 - May 1996 (Inactive April 1996 – 5 June 1999)
50. MG Freddy E. McFarren, 9 June 1999 - 4 August 2000
51. MG Robert J. St. Onge Jr., 4 August 2000 - 7 November 2001
52. MG Thomas F. Metz, 7 November 2001- 3 February 2003
53. BG Frank Helmick, 3 February 2003 - 15 May 2003
54. MG Dennis E. Hardy, 15 May 2003 - 1 August 2006 (Inactive since August 2006)

== Sources ==
=== Internet ===
- "24th Infantry Division Commanding Generals". 24thida.com. Brunswick, GA: The 24th Infantry Division Association. 2010.
- Tredway, Norman E. (2010). "24th Infantry Division History". 24thida.com. Brunswick, GA: The 24th Infantry Division Association.
