= Battle for Jalibah Airfield =

1991 battle of the Gulf War

Coordinates: 30°32′49″N 46°36′8″E

- Part of the Gulf War
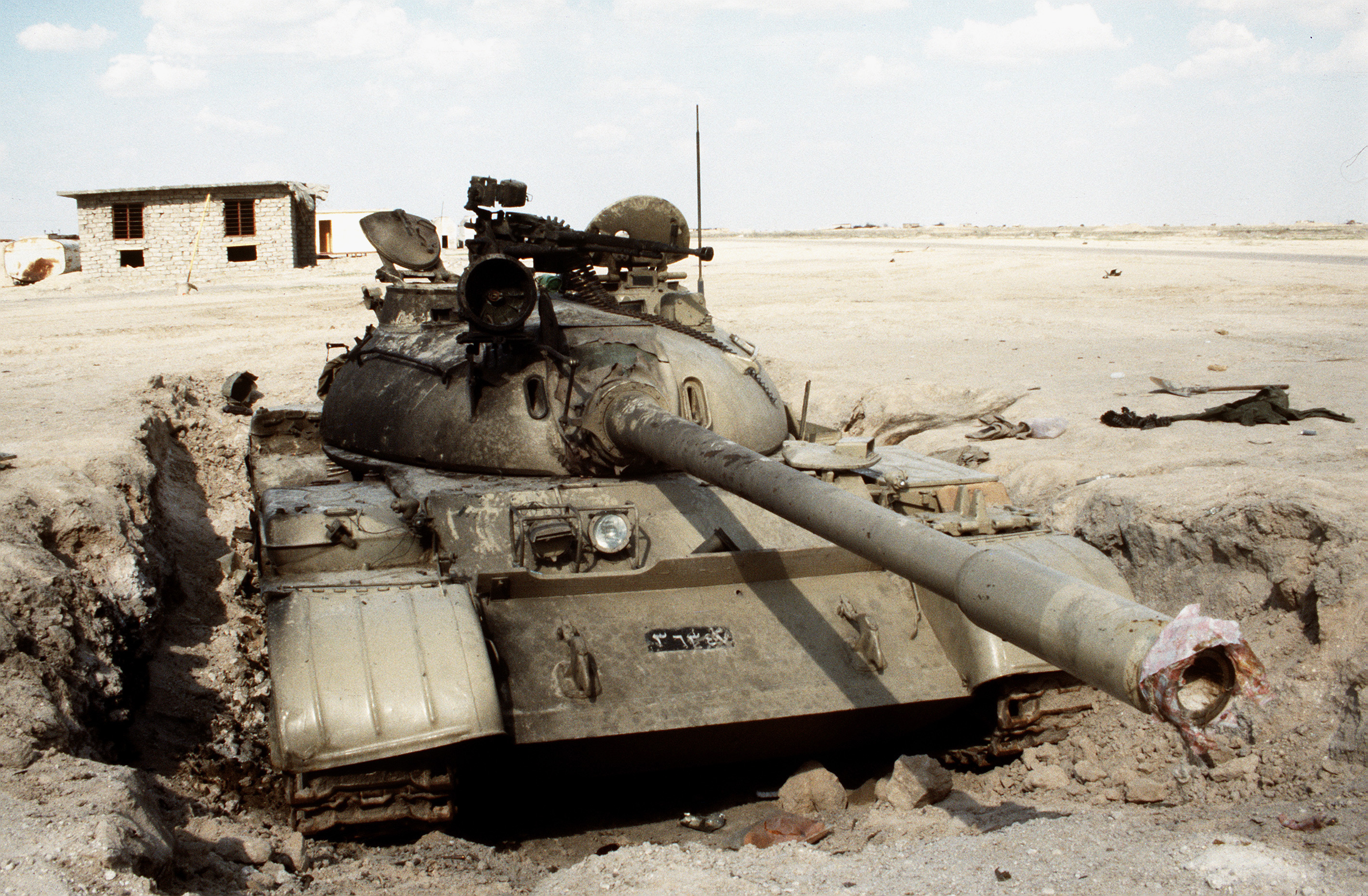
- A disabled Iraqi T-55 tank at the airfield on 2 March 1991
Date	27 February 1991
Location	Jalibah Southeast Air Base
Result	American victory

Belligerents
United States	(Ba'athist Iraq) Iraq

Casualties and losses
2 killed 9 wounded (1 wounded by hostile fire); 3 IFVs damaged	2,000 casualties 31–40 tanks destroyed (Note: Strength of a Soviet tank battalion in the late 1980s); 80 AA guns destroyed 20 aircraft shot down

The Battle for Jalibah Airfield took place when the U.S. 2nd Brigade, 24th Infantry Division successfully attacked and captured the heavily defended Jalibah Southeast Air Base military airfield in Iraq, located 80 miles west of Basra, on February 27, 1991 during the Gulf War.

== Battle ==
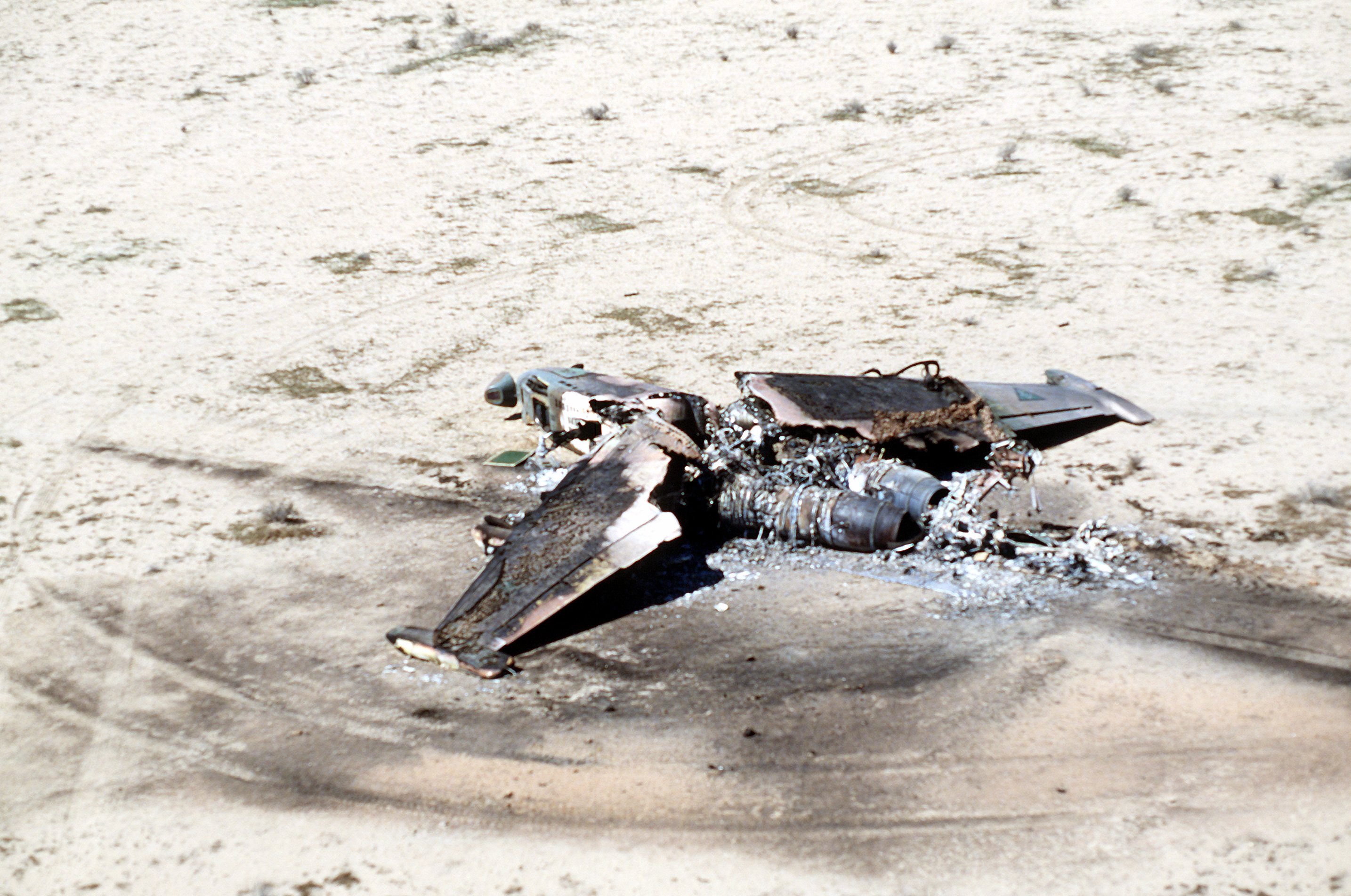
A destroyed Iraqi Su-25 aircraft at Jalibah on 3 March 1991

Satellite and aircraft reconnaissance indicated the presence of many dug-in Iraqi soldiers, anti-aircraft guns, and tanks prior to the attack on the airfield. At 6 a.m. the morning of 27 February, following an intensive artillery barrage, about 200 vehicles of the 2nd Brigade, under the command of Colonel Paul J. Kern, charged into the airfield and secured it after four hours of fighting.

Two thousand enemy soldiers, 80 anti-aircraft guns, and a tank battalion were knocked out of action in this brilliantly executed attack. The airfield fuel supplies and ammunition were blown up in a thunderous roar that could be heard for 30 kilometers (19 miles). 20 enemy aircraft were destroyed. Colonel Paul Kern and his Brigade had become the 'aces' of the campaign. Major General McCaffrey flew into the captured Jalibah airstrip to congratulate Colonel Kern of the 2nd Brigade's superb victory.

According to 2nd Lieutenant Neal Creighton, Iraqi soldiers "tried to hide in shallow bunkers and some tried to surrender. Most that moved were quickly cut down under a swath of machine gun fire. The burning helicopters, jets and dead soldiers seemed almost unreal. ... My soldiers were alive." Major David S. Pierson, who served as a task-force intelligence captain in the 2nd Brigade, said he eventually felt "guilty that we had slaughtered them so; guilty that we had performed so well and they so poorly; guilty that we were running up the score. ... They were like children fleeing before us, unorganized, scared, wishing it all would end. We continued to pour it on."

Only one U.S. soldier, 2nd Lieutenant John Ford, was wounded by enemy fire during the battle. In the confusion, however, three U.S. M2 Bradley infantry fighting vehicles of C Company, 3rd Battalion, 15th Infantry Regiment were accidentally hit with 5 depleted uranium rounds fired by the tanks of Charlie Company, 3rd Battalion, 69th Armor Regiment. At the time, the Task Force was under indirect fire and were "buttoned up." The engagement took place using their thermal sights and the Bradleys of C Company were misidentified as retreating Iraqi vehicles. They fired between 15 and 25 rounds at what they identified as Iraqi T-72 tanks. This friendly fire incident resulted in the 10 additional American casualties: two deaths and eight injuries.
