= 170th Infantry Brigade (United States) =

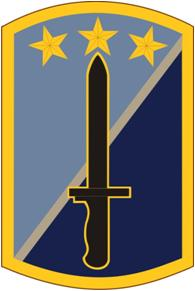
- Shoulder sleeve insignia
- Active: 25 August 1917 – August 1919; 1921 – 1942; 15 July 2009 – 9 October 2012
- Country: United States
- Branch: United States Army
- Type: Infantry
- Role: Heavy Infantry
- Size: Brigade
- Part of: V Corps
- Garrison/HQ: Baumholder, Germany
- Mottos: "Strength, Honor, Discipline"
- Engagements: World War I American Expeditionary Force, Russia; World War II; Rome-Arno, North Apennines, Po Valley; Gulf War; Defense of Saudi Arabia, Liberation and Defense of Kuwait Operation Enduring Freedom

Insignia
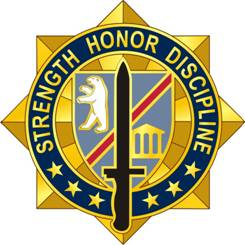
- Distinctive unit insignia

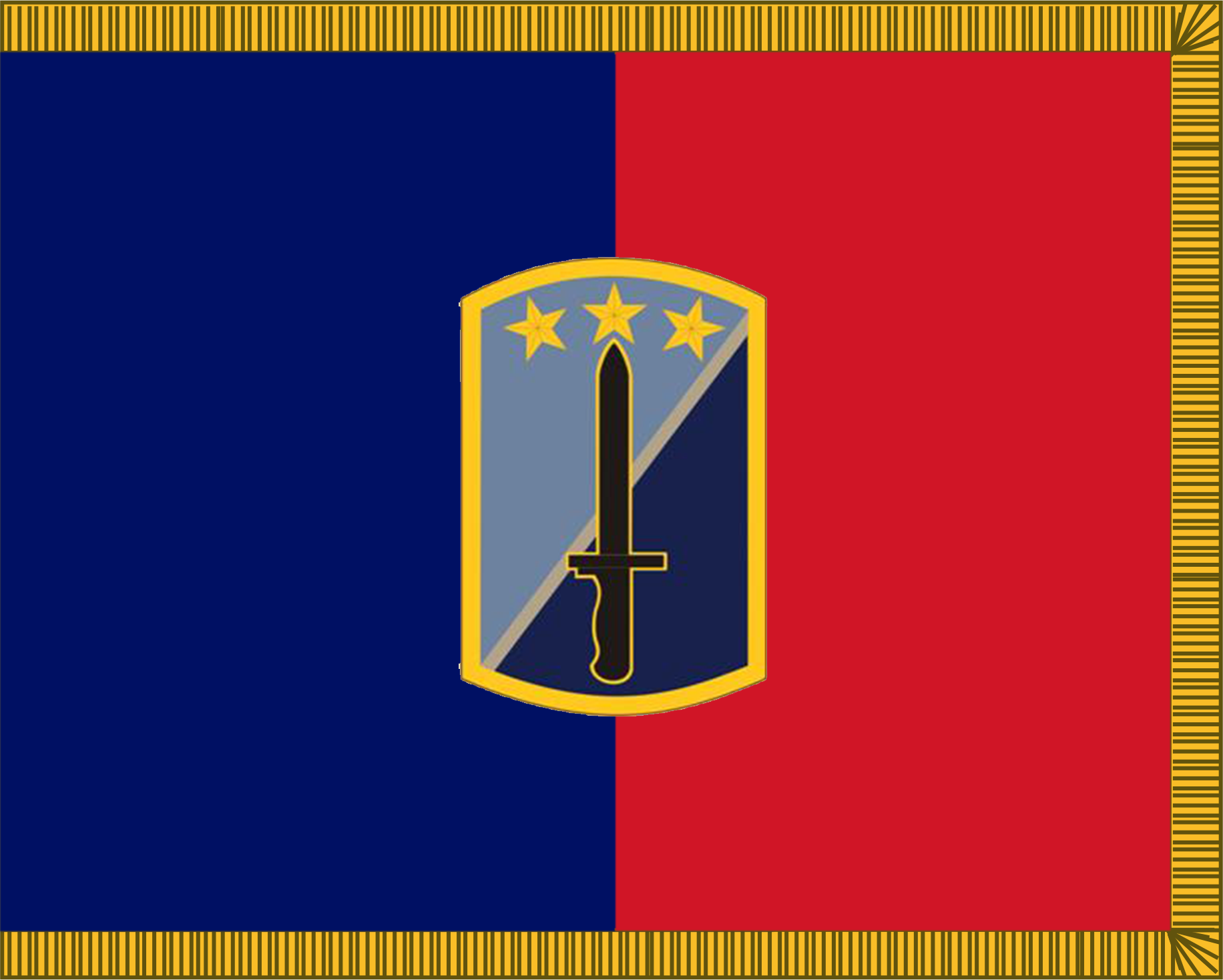
- 170th Infantry Brigade Flag

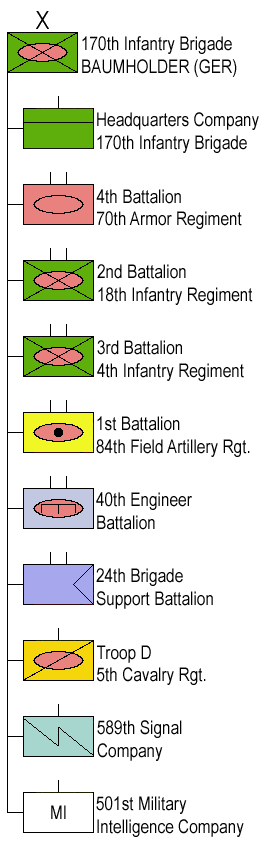
Structure 170th Infantry Brigade

The 170th Infantry Brigade was an infantry formation of the United States Army. From 2009 to 2012, as part of its third period of existence, it was based at Baumholder in the Federal Republic of Germany.

== World War I ==
The 170th Infantry Brigade was first activated 25 August 1917 at Camp Custer, Michigan. Commanded initially by Julius Penn, it was one of two brigades of the 85th Infantry Division, National Army.

- Headquarters, 170th Brigade
  - 339th Infantry Regiment
  - 340th Infantry Regiment
  - 330th Machine Gun Battalion

After a year of training the division left the U.S. for England. When the American Expeditionary Force North Russia was formed to be sent to Arkhangelsk, Russia, the 339th Infantry Regiment provided the infantry component, with support units also taken from the 85th Division sent along as well. While there, the 339th saw combat against the Bolsheviks. The 340th Infantry Regiment and the remainder of the Brigade was stationed in Lorraine, on the Western Front in France where the 85th served as a depot division and did not participate in any combat operations.

== Interwar period and World War II ==
The 170th Infantry Brigade arrived at the port of New York on 2 April 1919 on the troopship USS Leviathan and was transferred on 2 April 1919 at Camp Mills, New York. It was transferred again to Camp Custer, Michigan, where it was demobilized on 23 April 1919. Per the National Defense Act of 1920, the brigade was reconstituted in the Organized Reserve on 24 June 1921, assigned to the 85th Division, and allotted to the Sixth Corps Area. The brigade headquarters and headquarters company (HHC) was initiated on 21 March 1922 at Detroit, Michigan. Redesignated HHC, 170th Brigade on 23 March 1925; redesignated HHC, 170th Infantry Brigade on 24 August 1936. Conducted summer training most years at Camp Custer, Michigan, 1922–40, and some years at Fort Sheridan, Illinois. Conducted summer training at Camp Grayling, Michigan, with the Michigan National Guard's 63rd Infantry Brigade in 1929. As alternate forms of summer training, the brigade's subordinate regiments conducted Citizens Military Training Camps at Camp Custer or Fort Brady, Michigan, with assistance from the 2nd Infantry Regiment.

When the 85th Infantry Division was ordered into active military service on 15 May 1942, it was reorganized as a triangular division with direct control of the 337th, 338th, and 339th Infantry Regiments and no intermediate brigade headquarters; the 170th Infantry Brigade headquarters company was converted into the 85th Reconnaissance Troop, which served as the "eyes and ears" of the 85th Infantry Division throughout World War II.

== Interwar to 1970 ==
With the reestablishment of brigades in the TOE of divisions in the 1960s following the short-lived experiment with pentomic organization, the 2nd Brigade, 24th Infantry Division was in 1963 assigned the heritage of the 170th Infantry Brigade. The 24th Division was inactivated in 1970, then reactivated from 1975 to 1996. When the 24th was reactivated again in 1999 it was as a headquarters unit only with separate National Guard brigades attached and no organic brigades of its own. It was inactivated again on 1 August 2006.

== From 2009-2012 ==
The 170th Infantry Brigade of the United States Army was reestablished 15 July 2009 at U.S. Army Garrison Baumholder in Germany as part of the Grow the Army Plan. The 170th Infantry Brigade was formed by reflagging the 2nd Brigade, 1st Armored Division. The soldiers and equipment will remain in place but the 2d Brigade flag will transfer to Ft. Bliss, Texas, joining other elements of the 1st Armored Division. The 170th Infantry Brigade is organized as an enlarged hybrid of the Army XXI Heavy Division Infantry Brigade and modular brigade designs, as it incorporates both organic artillery and engineer battalions together with three infantry and armor units.

=== Afghanistan ===
In late 2010 part of the unit deployed to Northern Afghanistan (RC-N)to take part in a NATO training mission in conjunction with the ANA and ANP.

In early 2011, the 170th IBCT deployed in support of Operation Enduring Freedom 11–12 to Regional Command North. During the brigade's deployment, it partnered with the 303rd Afghan Uniformed Police and the Afghan Border Police's 5th Zone. Key highlights of the deployment include the handover of security responsibilities for Mazar E Sharif from the International Security Assistance Force to the Government of the Islamic Republic of Afghanistan by the Germans. The brigade also deployed two of its battalions for separate missions in support of other regional commands. The 3d Battalion, 4th Infantry Regiment deployed in November 2010 to Regional Command Capital where it initially assumed part of the NTMA training mission in and around Kabul. It later transitioned to a security force mission across Afghanistan, ensuring various NTMA elements and VIPs were able to accomplish their tasks in a secure environment. The brigade's 4th Battalion, 70th Armor Regiment deployed to Regional Command South where it operated under Combined Team Uruzgan, partnered with the Australian Army. The brigade is redeployed back to Baumholder, Germany in early 2012. A total of eight brigade soldiers died during the deployment.

The 170th Infantry Brigade included the following subordinate units in 2011:

- Headquarters and Headquarters Company, 170th Infantry Brigade
- Troop D, 5th Cavalry Regiment
- 4th Battalion, 70th Armor Regiment
- 2nd Battalion, 18th Infantry Regiment
- 3rd Battalion, 4th Infantry Regiment
- 1st Battalion, 84th Field Artillery Regiment
- 40th Engineer Battalion (in addition to engineer companies, also controls the below units)
  - 589th Signal Company
  - 502nd Military Intelligence Company
  - 2nd Platoon, 501st Military Police Company
  - 23d Military Police Platoon
- 24th Brigade Support Battalion

In February 2012, Military.com announced that the brigade would be inactivated by the summer of 2012. Over the course of the year, 4,000 of the brigade's 4,500 soldiers were reassigned. On 9 October 2012, the 170th Infantry Brigade was inactivated in Germany, with the remaining 500 soldiers present for the event.
