= Battle of Naktong Bulge =

Battle of Naktong Bulge refers to several engagements during the Korean War:

- First Battle of Naktong Bulge, August 5–19, 1950
- Second Battle of Naktong Bulge, September 1–15, 1950
