= Archibald Roberts =

American Army officer (1915–2006)

Archibald Edward Roberts
- Born: March 21, 1915; Cheboygan, Michigan
- Died: July 28, 2006; Fort Collins, Colorado
- Burial place: Fort Collins, Colorado
- Military career
- Allegiance: United States of America
- Branch: United States Army
- Service years: 1939–1965
- Rank: Lieutenant Colonel
- Units: 11th Airborne Division, 187th Airborne Regimental Combat Team, 101st Airborne Division, 3rd Infantry Division, 24th Infantry Division
- Conflicts: World War II; Korean War

Lieutenant Colonel Archibald E. Roberts (1915–2006) was commissioned a 2nd Lieutenant in the U.S. Army on 19 December 1942 and served as a paratrooper in the 11th Airborne Division. In 1959 he served as the information officer for Major General Edwin Walker who was the commander of the 24th Infantry Division in Germany. Roberts wrote and directed the program "Pro Blue" troop information program in 1959. It was named after the color of some Army maps. Walker and Roberts were relieved of command in 1961 after the accusation that he and LTC Roberts had distributed John Birch Society literature to troops under them in that program.

Roberts was forced out of the Army after 18 years of service because he made a political speech to the Daughters of the American Revolution. This prevented him from collecting his retirement pay. He successfully sued the Army for reinstatement. Colonel Roberts remained active in right-wing political activities for many years after his retirement. This includes many appearances on Denver area talk radio shows. He is the author of The Most Secret Science. This book claims that there is ancient science of control of large populations by a small ruling class.

== Books ==
- Victory Denied. Chicago: Chas, Hallberg & Co. (1966). OCLC 1036895974.
- Peace: By the Wonderful People Who Brought You Korea & Vietnam. Fullerton, Calif.: Educator Publications (1972). Foreword by John R. Rarick. OCLC 572255.
- The Republic: Decline and Future Promise. Fort Collins, Colo.: Betsy Ross Press (1975). ISBN 0318617838. 96 p.
- The Anatomy of a Revolution. Fort Collins, Colo.: Betsy Ross Press (1975). 32 p.
- Emerging Struggle for State Sovereignty. Fort Collins, Colo.: Betsy Ross Press (1979). ISBN 0934120072. 301 p.
- The Most Secret Science. Fort Collins, Colo.: Betsy Ross Press (1988).
- America in Crisis Survival Portfolio. Fort Collins, Colo.: Betsy Ross Press (1992).
