= General Macdonald =

General Macdonald or MacDonald may refer to:

- Alastair Macdonald (British Army officer) (fl. 1850s–1880s), British Army major general
- Arthur MacDonald (1919–1995), Australian Army general
- Donald Alexander Macdonald (general) (1845–1920), Canadian Militia major general
- Étienne Macdonald (1765–1840), French Army general
- George Macdonald (Canadian general) (born c. 1950), Royal Canadian Air Force lieutenant general
- Godfrey Macdonald, 3rd Baron Macdonald (1775–1832), British Army lieutenant general
- Hector MacDonald (1853–1903), British Army major general
- John Macdonald (British Army officer, born 1907) (1907–1979), British Army major general
- John Macdonald (British Army officer, died 1850) (before 1795–1850), British Army lieutenant general

== See also ==
- Bruce Alexander McDonald (1925–1993), Australian Army major general
- Charles C. McDonald (1933–2017), U.S. Air Force general
- John Bacon McDonald (1859–1927), U.S. Army brigadier general
- Attorney General Macdonald (disambiguation)
