= 310th Infantry Regiment =

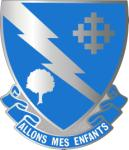
- Regimental Distinctive Unit Insignia
- Active: 1917–1919; 1921–1946; 1946–present
- Country: USA
- Branch: U.S. Army
- Role: Infantry
- Size: Regiment
- Part of: First Army
- Motto: Allons Mes Enfants (Let’s go my sons)
- Anniversaries: Constituted 5 August 1917 in the National Army
- Engagements: Remagen Bridgehead
- Decorations: Presidential Unit Citation; Army Superior Unit Award
- Battle honours: World War I World War II

Commanders
- Notable commanders: Walter C. Babcock; Thomas H. Hayes

The 310th Infantry Regiment was a National Army Infantry Regiment first organized for service in World War I as part of the 78th Division. It later served in the European Theater during World War II. Since then it has served as a training Regiment, training Army Reserve and Army National Guard soldiers for service after the September 11 terrorist attacks.

== Service history ==
=== World War I ===
The Regiment was constituted 5 August 1917 in the National Army as the 310th Infantry and assigned to the 155th Infantry Brigade of the 78th Division. It was organized at Camp Dix, New Jersey, on 6 September 1917. The regiment was organized with 3,755 officers and enlisted men:

- Headquarters & Headquarters Company- 303
  - Supply Company- 140
  - Machine Gun Company- 178
  - Medical & Chaplain Detachment- 56
- Infantry Battalion (x3)- 1,026
  - Headquarters- 2
  - Rifle Company (x4)- 256

The Doughboys of the regiment deployed to France as part of the American Expeditionary Forces and participated in the St. Mihiel, Meuse-Argonne, and Lorraine campaigns. After completing its war service in France, the regiment returned home aboard the USS Tiger. They arrived at the Port of New York on 31 May 1919 and demobilized at Camp Dix on 6 June 1919.

=== Between the Wars ===
The regiment was reconstituted in the Organized Reserves as the 310th Infantry on 24 June 1921 and reassigned to the 78th Division (later redesignated as the 78th Infantry Division) in the First Corps Area. It was organized in December 1921 with the Regimental Headquarters in Jersey City. The regiment normally conducted summer training at Camp Dix with the 16th and 18th Infantry Regiments or at Plattsburg Barracks with the 26th Infantry Regiment. The regiment was tasked to conduct Citizens' Military Training Camp (CMTC) some years as an alternative summer training. Rutgers University was the primary ROTC feeder school.

=== World War II ===
The regiment was ordered into active military service 15 August 1942 and reorganized at Camp Butner, North Carolina, using a cadre provided by the 2nd Infantry Division. In July 1943, the regiment was organized with 3,256 officers and enlisted men:

- Headquarters & Headquarters Company- 111
  - Service Company- 114
  - Anti-Tank Company- 165
  - Cannon Company- 118
  - Medical Detachment- 135
- Infantry Battalion (x3)- 871
  - Headquarters & Headquarters Company- 126
  - Rifle Company (x3)- 193
  - Weapons Company- 156

The regiment served in the Rhineland, Ardennes-Alsace, Central Europe campaigns. The regiment was inactivated 15 June 1946 in Germany.

=== Post War Service ===
The Regiment was reconstituted on 17 December 1946 in the Organized Reserves with headquarters in Jersey City, New Jersey, under TOE 29-7T. On 9 November 1955 the Regimental Headquarters was moved to Kearny, New Jersey and then to Lodi, New Jersey on 12 October 1961. The 1948 organization of the regiment called for a strength of 3,774 officers and enlisted men organized as below:

- Headquarters & Headquarters Company- 289
  - Service Company- 186
  - Tank Company- 148
  - Heavy Mortar Company- 190
  - Medical Company- 214
- Infantry Battalion (x3)
  - Headquarters & Headquarters Company- 119
  - Rifle Company (x3)- 211
  - Weapons Company- 165

=== Under the 78th Training Division ===
The 310th Infantry was redesignated as the 310th Regiment (Basic Combat Training), and reorganized to consist of the 1st, 2d, and 3d Battalions, elements of the 78th Division (Training) on 31 January 1968, the Regimental Headquarters was deactivated. The 1st and 3rd Battalions were activated on 25 January 1991 to train Army Reserve units deploying to Operation Desert Storm and inactivated again on 31 March. The 1st Battalion was reactivated and allotted to the Regular Army on 17 October 1999 and assigned at Fort Dix.

=== Current Assignment ===
The 1st Battalion is a Regular Army unit assigned to the 181st Infantry Brigade at Fort McCoy, Wisconsin, with a mission to train Brigade Engineer Battalions, Military Police, and Chemical units. The Battalion frequently sends personnel to NTC and JRTC to train units conducting rotations.
The 2nd Battalion is an Army Reserve unit assigned to the 86th Training Division with a mission to train Combat Support and Combat Service Support units.

== Campaign streamers ==
| Conflict | Streamer | Year(s) |
|---|---|---|
| World War I | St. Mihiel | 1918 |
| World War I | Meuse-Argonne | 1918 |
| World War I | Lorraine 1918 | 1918 |
| World War II | Rhineland | 1944 |
| World War II | Ardennes-Alsace | 1944-1945 |
| World War II | Central Europe | 1945 |

== Decorations ==
| Ribbon | Award | Year | Subordinate Elements | Embroidered | Notes |
|---|---|---|---|---|---|
| | Presidential Unit Citation | 1944 | 1st Battalion | ’’’REMAGEN BRIDGEHEAD’’’ | |
| | Presidential Unit Citation | 1944 | 3rd Battalion | ’’’ROER-RHINE RIVERS’’’ | |
| | Army Meritorious Unit Commendation | Afghanistan Retrograde 2021–2022 | 1st Battalion | 2021-2022 | Permanent Orders 032-0001 announcing award of the Army Meritorious Unit Commendation |
| | Army Superior Unit Award | 2008-2011 | 1st Battalion; 2nd Battalion | 2008-2011 | Permanent Order 202-27, 21 July 2009 & General Order 2013-16 |
| None | Secretary of the Army; Superior Unit Certificate | 1960-1961 | 3rd Battalion | None | Department of the Army General Orders 15, 1962 |
