= 181st Infantry Brigade (United States) =

- Shoulder sleeve insignia
- Active: 5 August 1917 – 19 November 1945; 25 January 1947 – 17 May 1954; 17 April 1956 – 1 May 1959; 1 April 1963 – 31 December 1965; 1 December 2006 – present
- Country: United States
- Branch: United States Army
- Type: Infantry
- Role: Training
- Size: Brigade
- Part of: 85th Support Command
- Garrison/HQ: Fort McCoy, Wisconsin
- Nickname: Eagle Brigade
- Mottos: Docere Bellum Et Pax Pacis "To Win War and Peace"
- Colors: Black & Red
- Anniversaries: 5 August 1917
- Decorations: Army Superior Unit Award
- Battle honours: World War I World War II

Commanders
- Current Commander: Colonel Ronald Hughes
- Notable commanders: Major Oscar F. Miller Medal of Honor; Colonel Jeffrey J. Kulp; Colonel Shawn Klawunder

Insignia
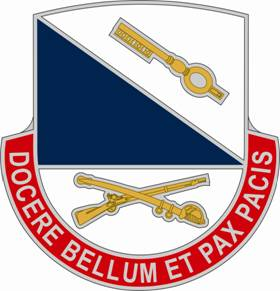
- Distinctive unit insignia

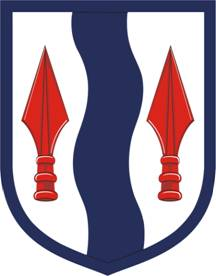
- Designated but not authorized shoulder sleeve insignia

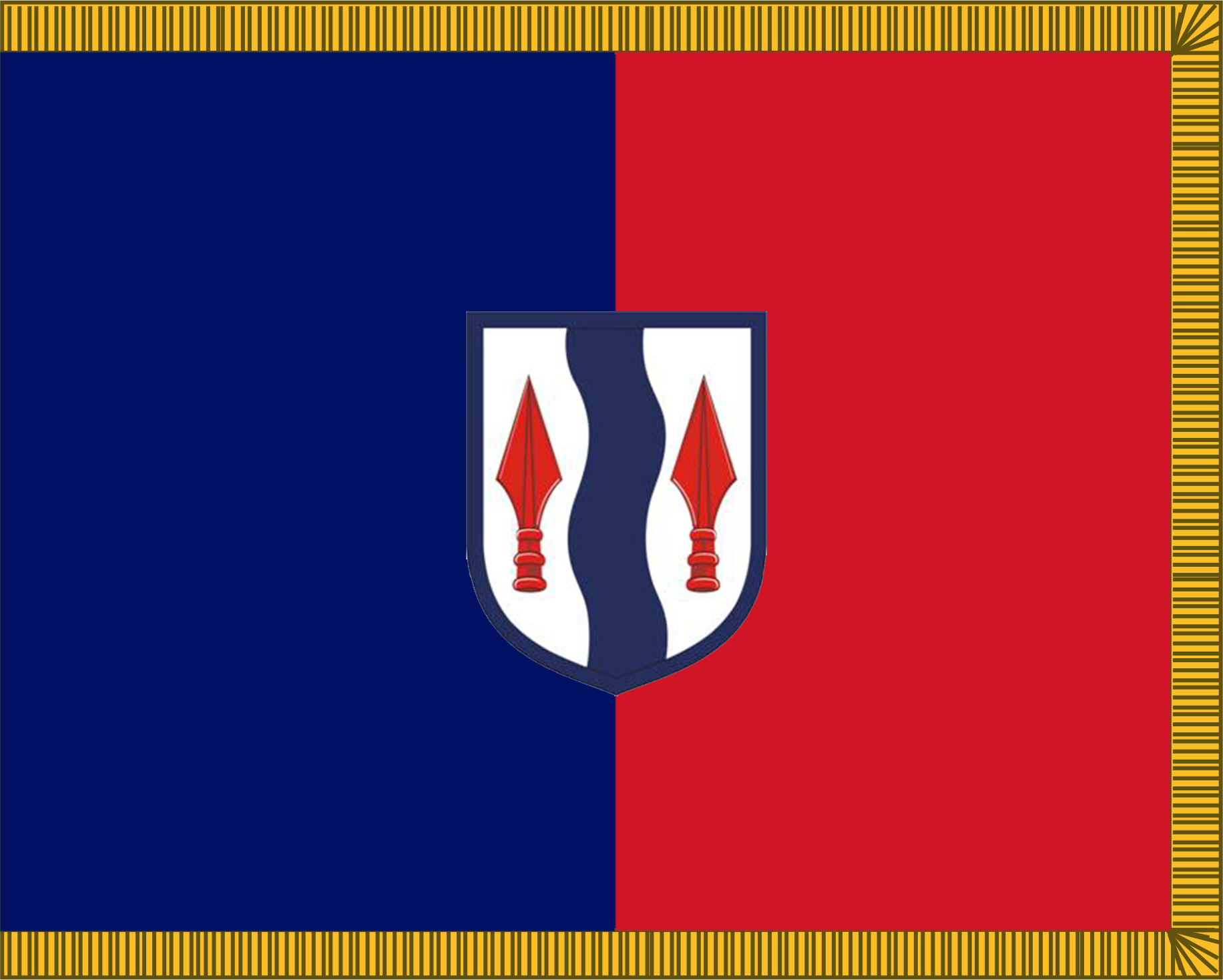
- 181st Infantry Brigade Flag

The 181st Infantry Brigade is an infantry brigade of the United States Army based at Fort McCoy, Wisconsin. As a First Army brigade, the unit serves primarily in a partnering and training role for Reserve Units. The brigade is subordinate to the First United States Army, headquartered at Rock Island Arsenal, Illinois. It has ten subordinate battalions.

The unit is responsible for training selected United States Army Reserve and Army National Guard units in the Central-Northern United States. The unit was formerly designated as 2nd Brigade, 63rd Infantry Division. The brigade was redesignated and re-missioned several times: such as in 1999, when the 181st was merged with the 2nd Brigade, 85th Division and carried that name and lineage from October 1993 until December 2006. The 181st Infantry Brigade currently falls under the 1st Army's Division West, headquartered at Fort Hood, Texas.

== Organization ==
=== World War I ===
During World War I, infantry brigades were purely tactical formations. Administrative and logistical functions were conducted by the division headquarters. The brigade headquarters was composed of the commander (a brigadier general), his three aides, a brigade adjutant, and eighteen enlisted men who furnished mess, transportation, and communications services.

Headquarters, 181st Brigade
361st Infantry Regiment
362nd Infantry Regiment
347th Machine Gun Battalion

=== World War II ===
With the demise of the Square Division in favor of the Triangular division, the now surplus brigade headquarters were converted into either the divisional headquarters company or the division's reconnaissance troop. The 181st was selected to transform into the 91st Infantry Division's reconnaissance troop.

91st Reconnaissance Troop

=== Organization 1963–1965 ===
On 1 April 1963, the brigade was reactivated as a subordinate to the 63rd Infantry Division in Pasadena, California. The division and subordinate elements were inactivated on 31 December 1965 as part of the elimination of the Army Reserve divisions.

Headquarters and Headquarters Company
3rd Battalion, 15th Infantry
4th Battalion, 27th Infantry

=== Organization 2006–2016 ===
The 181st Infantry Brigade was reactivated at Fort McCoy, Wisconsin in December 2006. The Brigade was constituted from the 12th Readiness Brigade and the 2nd Brigade, 85th Training Division.

Headquarters and Headquarters Company
3rd Battalion, 335th Regiment (Training Support Battalion)
1st Battalion, 338th Regiment (Training Support Battalion)
1st Battalion, 340th Regiment (Training Support Battalion)
3rd Battalion, 340th Regiment (Training Support Battalion)
2nd Battalion, 411th Regiment (Logistics Support Battalion)

=== Organization 2026 ===
The 181st Infantry Brigade is a Multi-Functional Training Brigade (MFTB) assigned to the 85th Support Command. Like all formations of the 85th Support Command, the brigade is not a combat formation, but instead trains Army Reserve and Army National Guard units preparing for deployment. As of January 2026, the brigade consists of a Headquarters and Headquarters Company, five active duty battalions, and five reserve battalions.

- 181st Infantry Brigade, at Fort McCoy (WI)
  - Headquarters and Headquarters Company, at Fort McCoy (WI)
  - 1st Battalion, 291st Regiment (Brigade Support Battalion), at Fort McCoy (WI)
  - 1st Battalion, 310th Regiment (Brigade Engineer Battalion), at Fort McCoy (WI)
  - 1st Battalion, 337th Regiment (Brigade Support Battalion), at Fort McCoy (WI)
  - 1st Battalion, 338th Regiment (Training Support), at Fort McCoy (WI)
  - 1st Battalion, 340th Regiment (Training Support), at Fort Snelling (MN)
  - 3rd Battalion, 340th Regiment (Brigade Engineer Battalion), at Fort McCoy (WI)
  - 1st Battalion, 351st Regiment (Brigade Support Battalion), at Fort McCoy (WI)
  - 2nd Battalion, 361st Regiment (Training Support), in Sioux Falls (SD)
  - 1st Battalion, 383rd Regiment (Training Support), at Fort Des Moines (IA)
  - 2nd Battalion, 411th Regiment (Logistical Support), at Fort McCoy (WI)

The brigade's four training support battalions and logistical support battalion are Army Reserve formations.

== History ==
=== World War I ===
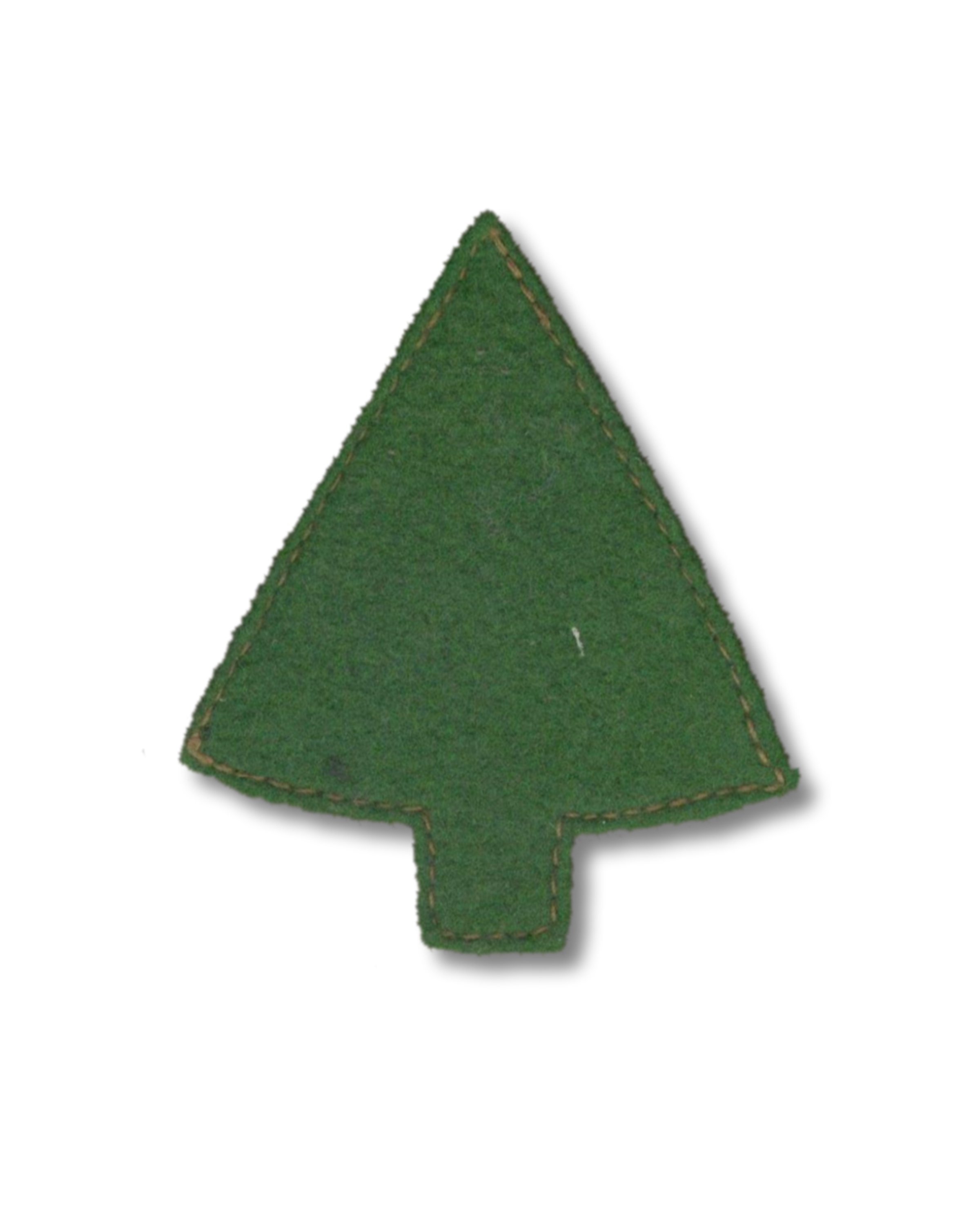

During World War I, the 181st Infantry Brigade was constituted 5 August 1917 in the National Army at Camp Lewis, Washington as a subordinate unit of the 91st Infantry Division. The Brigade was composed of 8,134 personnel organized in a Headquarters Detachment with 5 officers and 18 enlisted soldiers, the 361st and 362nd Infantry Regiments each with 3,755 officers and enlisted soldiers, and the 347th Machine Gun Battalion with 581 officers and enlisted soldiers. The 181st Infantry Brigade trained for 10 months at Camp Lewis under the command of Brigadier General Henry Delp Styer prior to being deployed to France in August 1918 under the command of Brigadier General John Bacon McDonald. After the Meuse-Argonne Offensive and the liberation of France, the Brigade was sent to assist the British during the battle of Ypres-Lys until the signing of the Armistice on 11 November 1918, which ended World War I. After four months of peacekeeping operations in liberated Belgium, the Brigade returned to the United States and arrived at the port of New York on 2 April 1919 on the USS Orizaba.

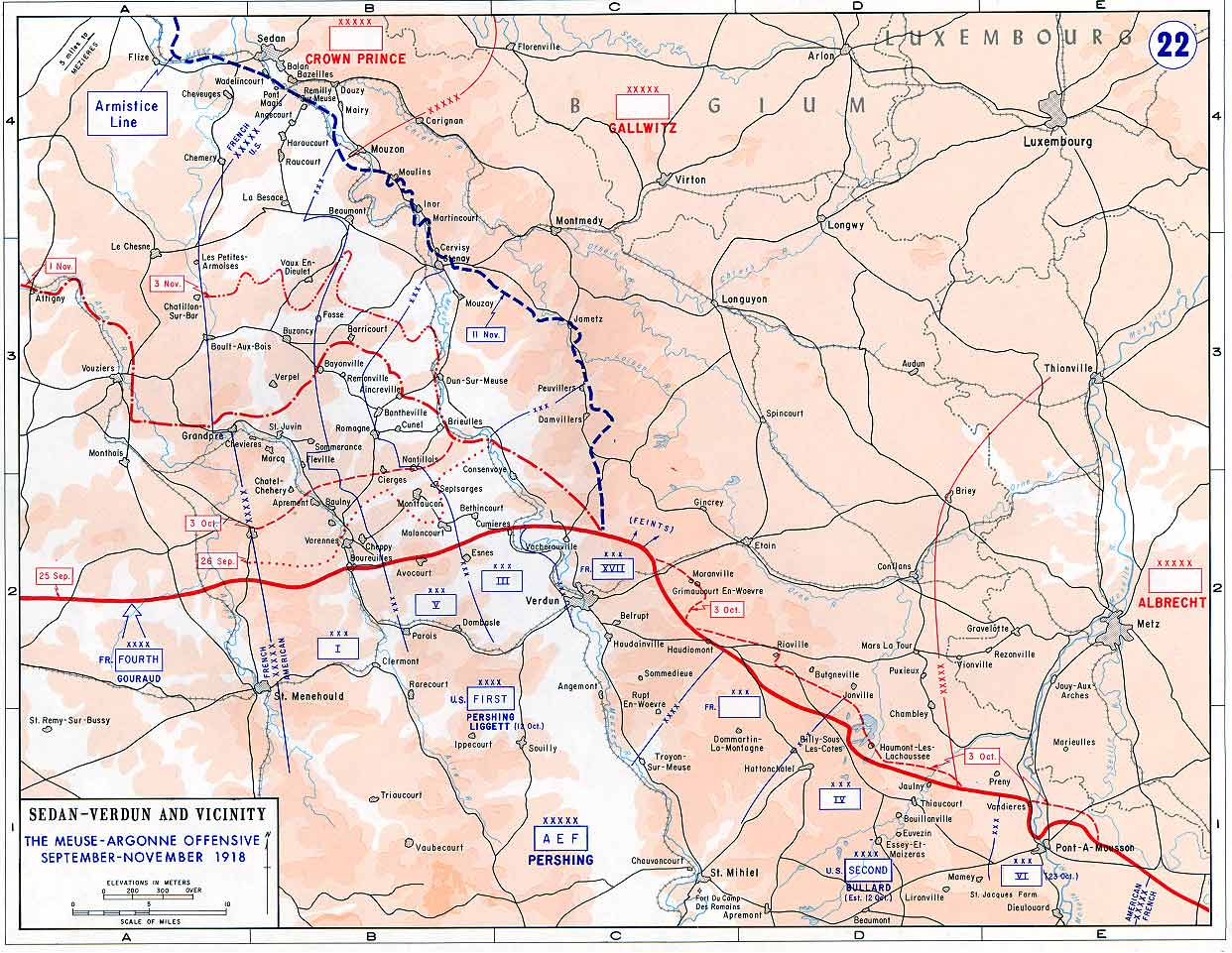

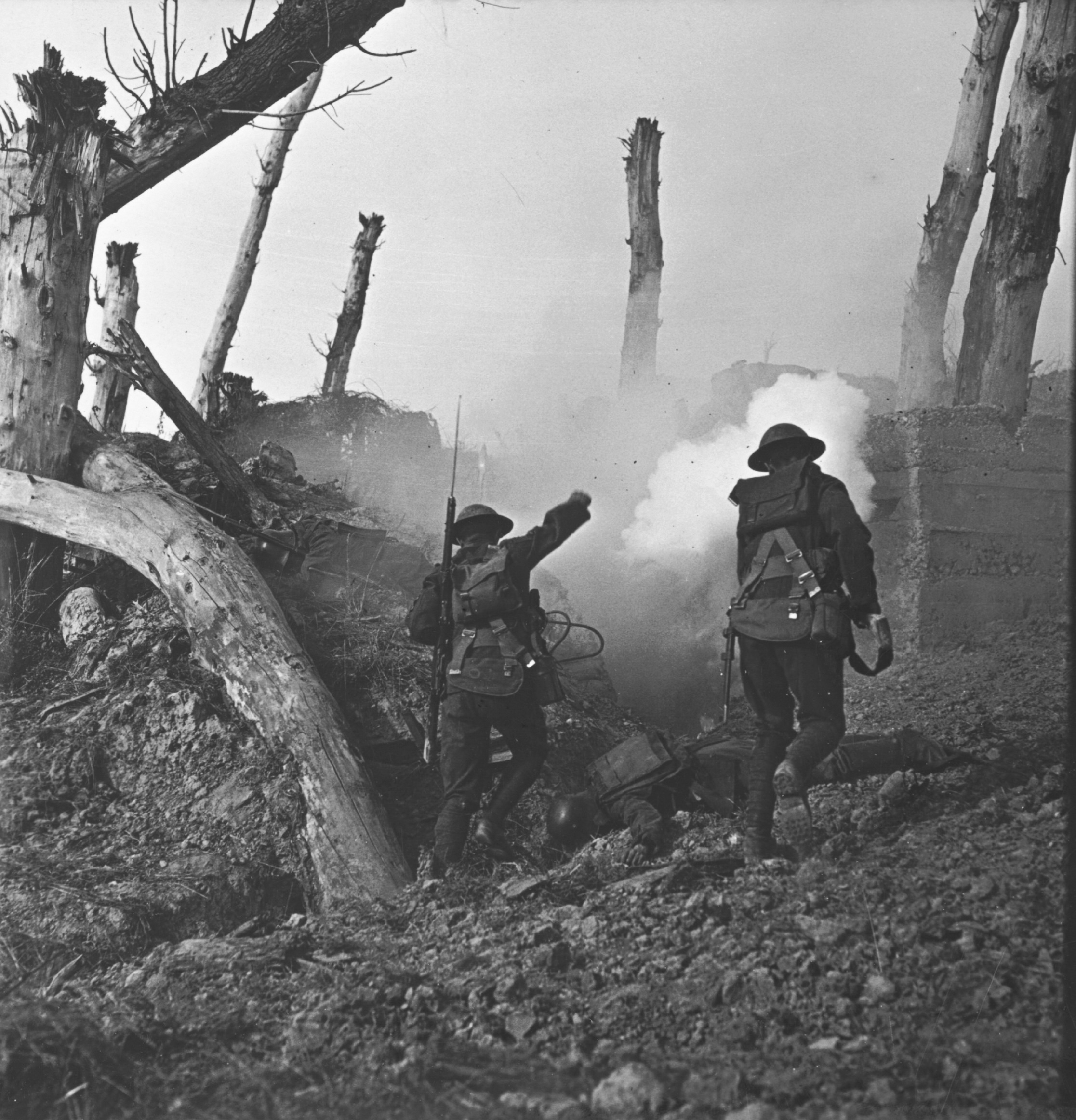

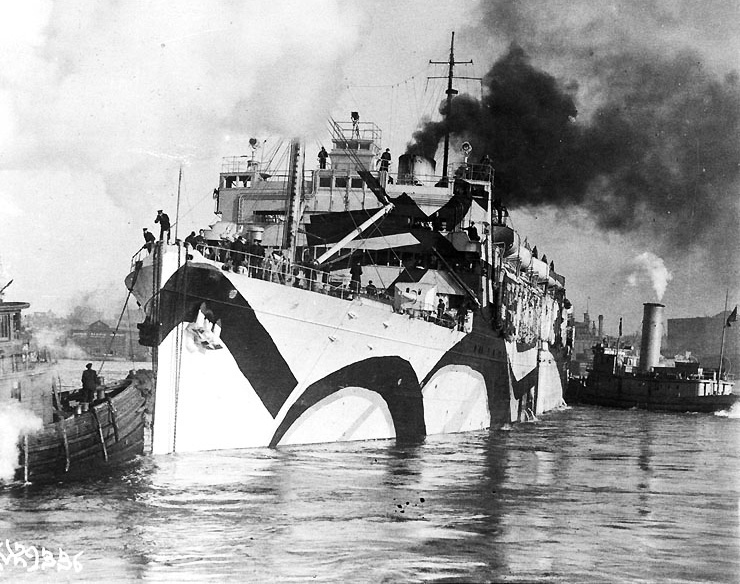
- Equipment:
  - M1917 Browning machine gun
  - M1918 Browning Automatic Rifle
  - M1917 Enfield
  - Brodie Helmet
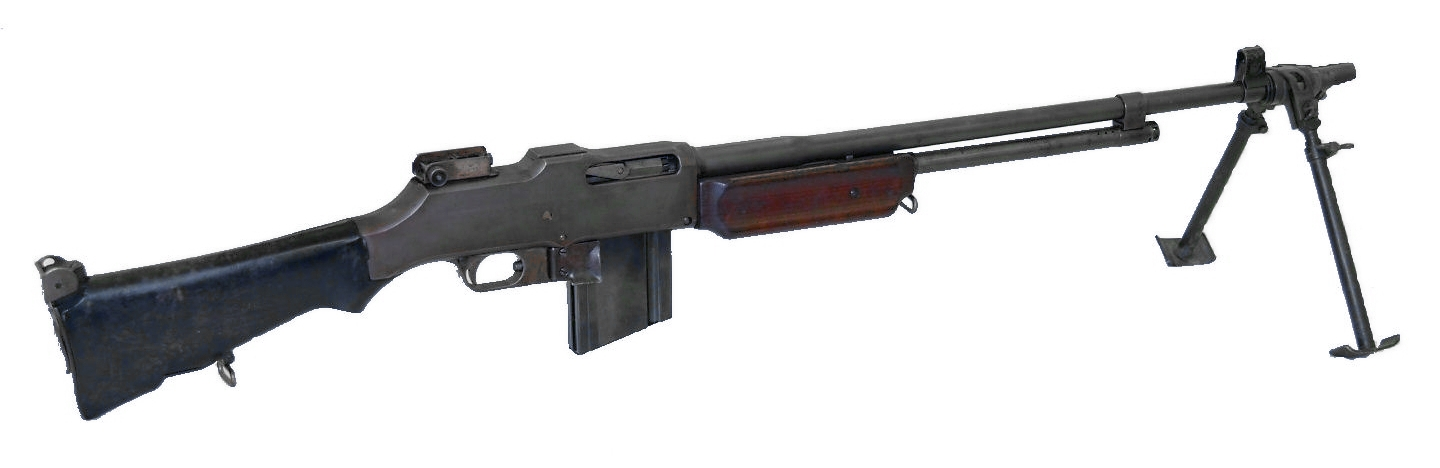

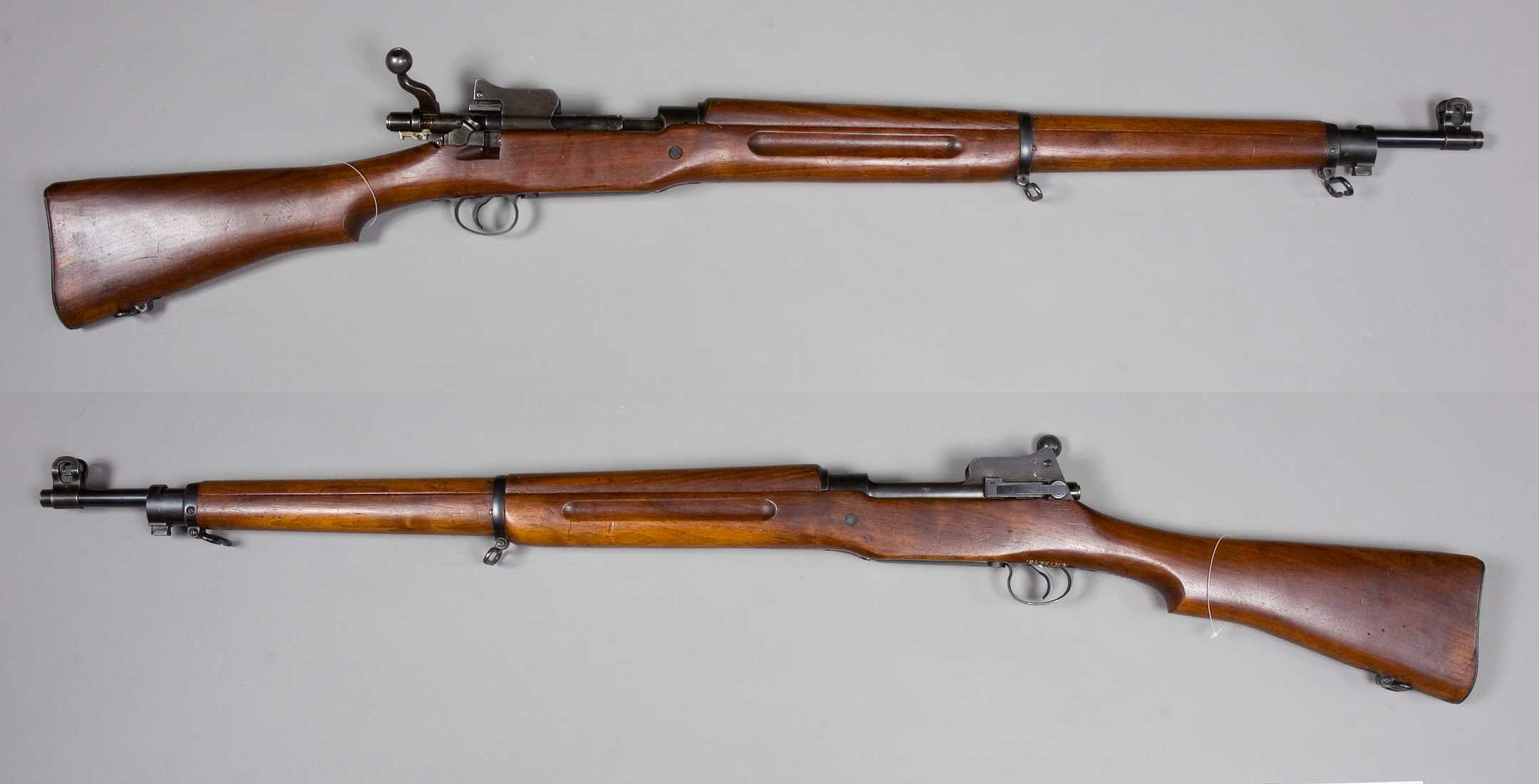

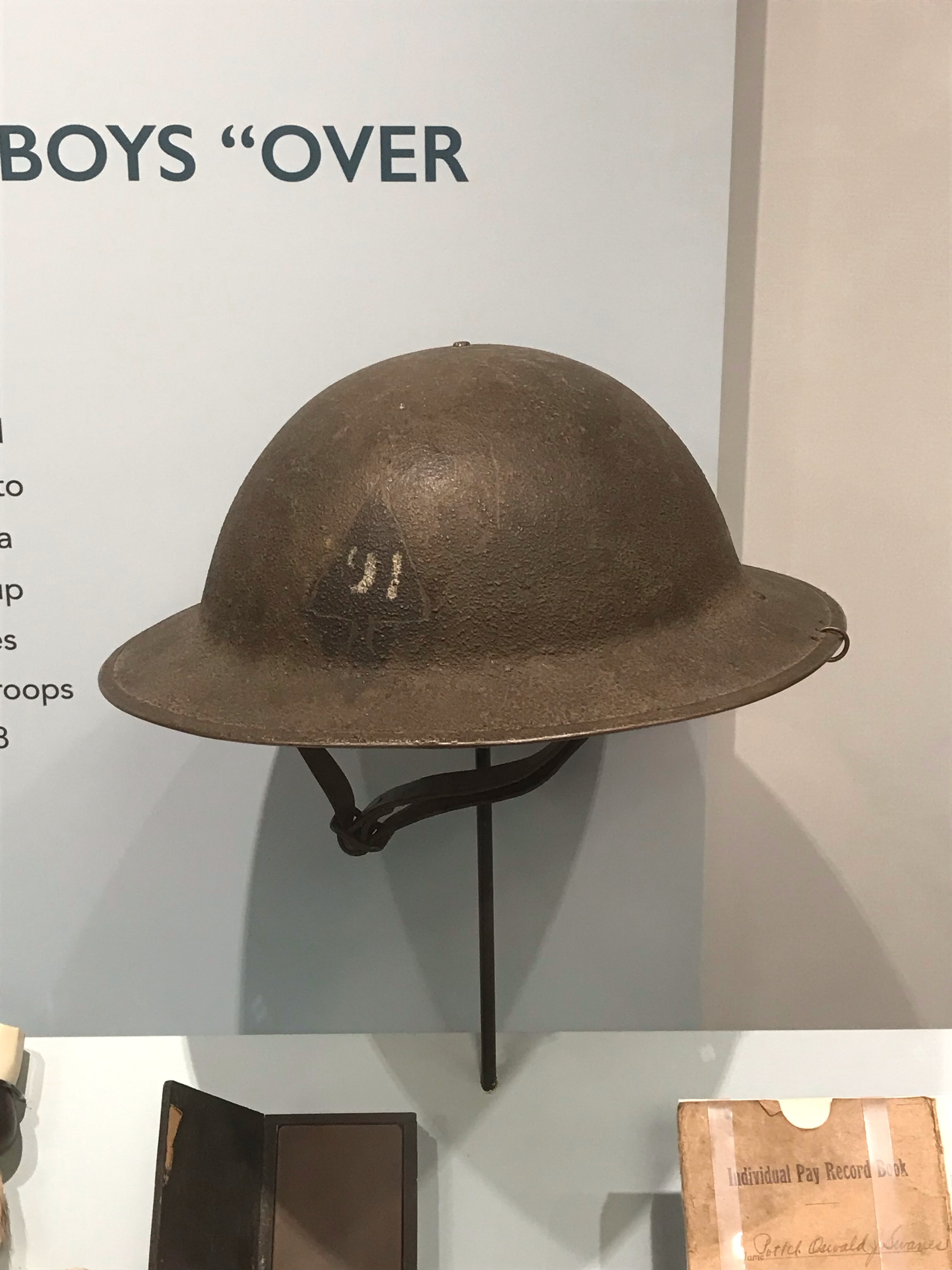

=== Inter War Period ===
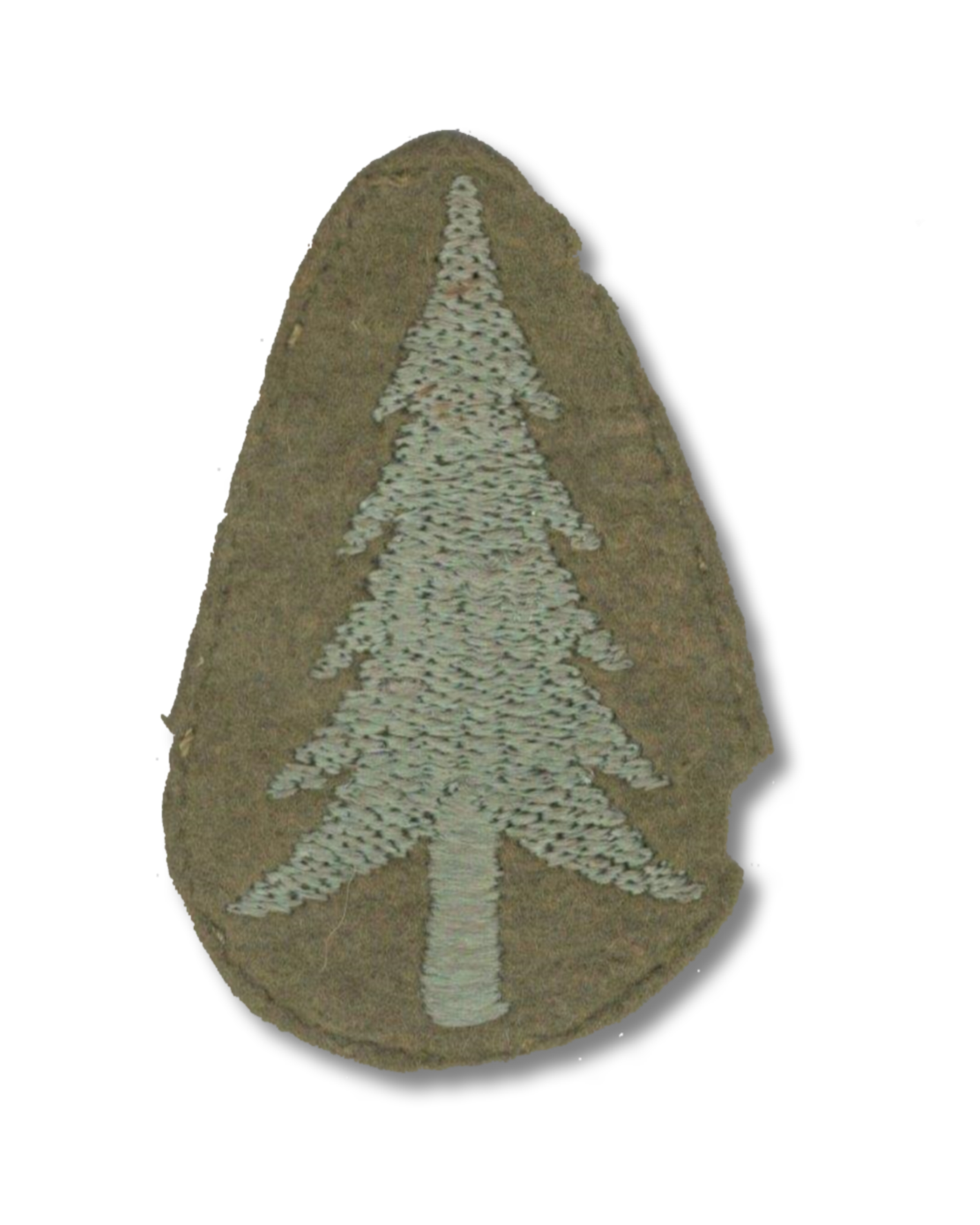

The Brigade was transferred on 2 April 1919 to Camp Merritt, New Jersey. It proceeded to Camp Kearny, California, where it was demobilized on 19 April 1919. The Brigade was reconstituted in the Organized Reserve on 24 June 1921, still assigned to the 91st Division, and allotted to the Ninth Corps Area. The Brigade was redesignated Headquarters & Headquarters Company (HHC), 181st Brigade on 23 March 1925 and again redesignated HHC, 181st Infantry Brigade on 24 August 1936. The unit conducted summer training most years at Del Monte, California, from 1922 to 1940. Subordinate regiments conducted training for the Citizens Military Training Camp (CMTC) at the Presidio of San Francisco, the Presidio of Monterey and at Del Monte; often with assistance from the 30th Infantry Regiment.

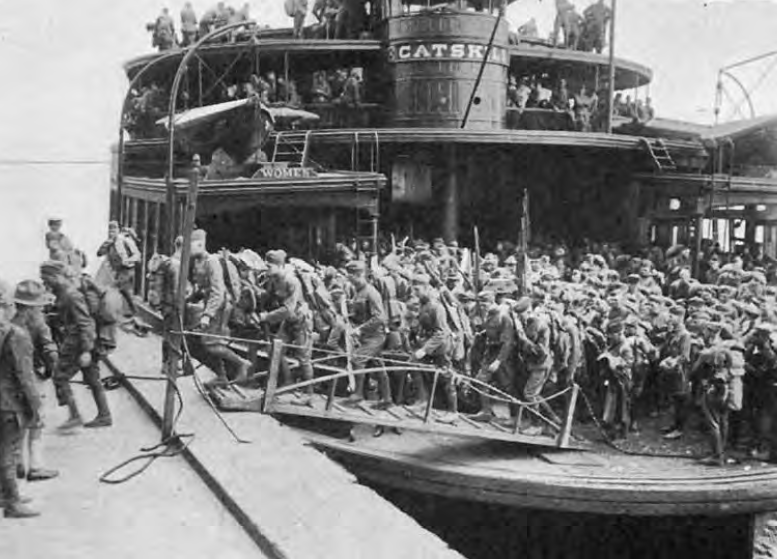

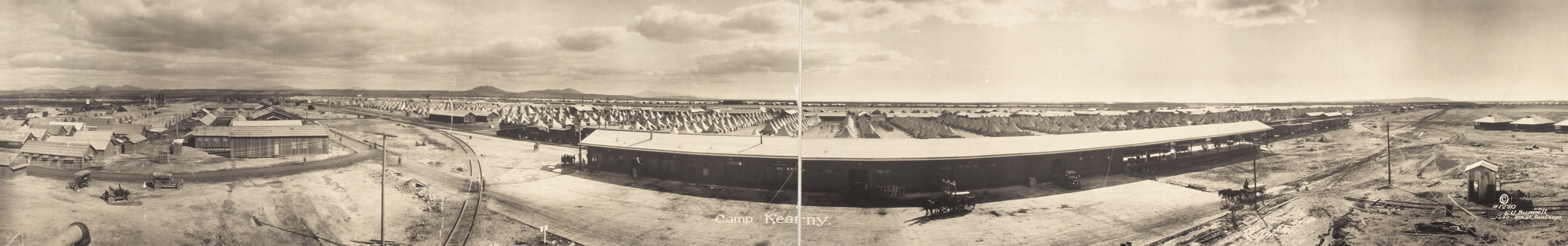

=== World War II ===
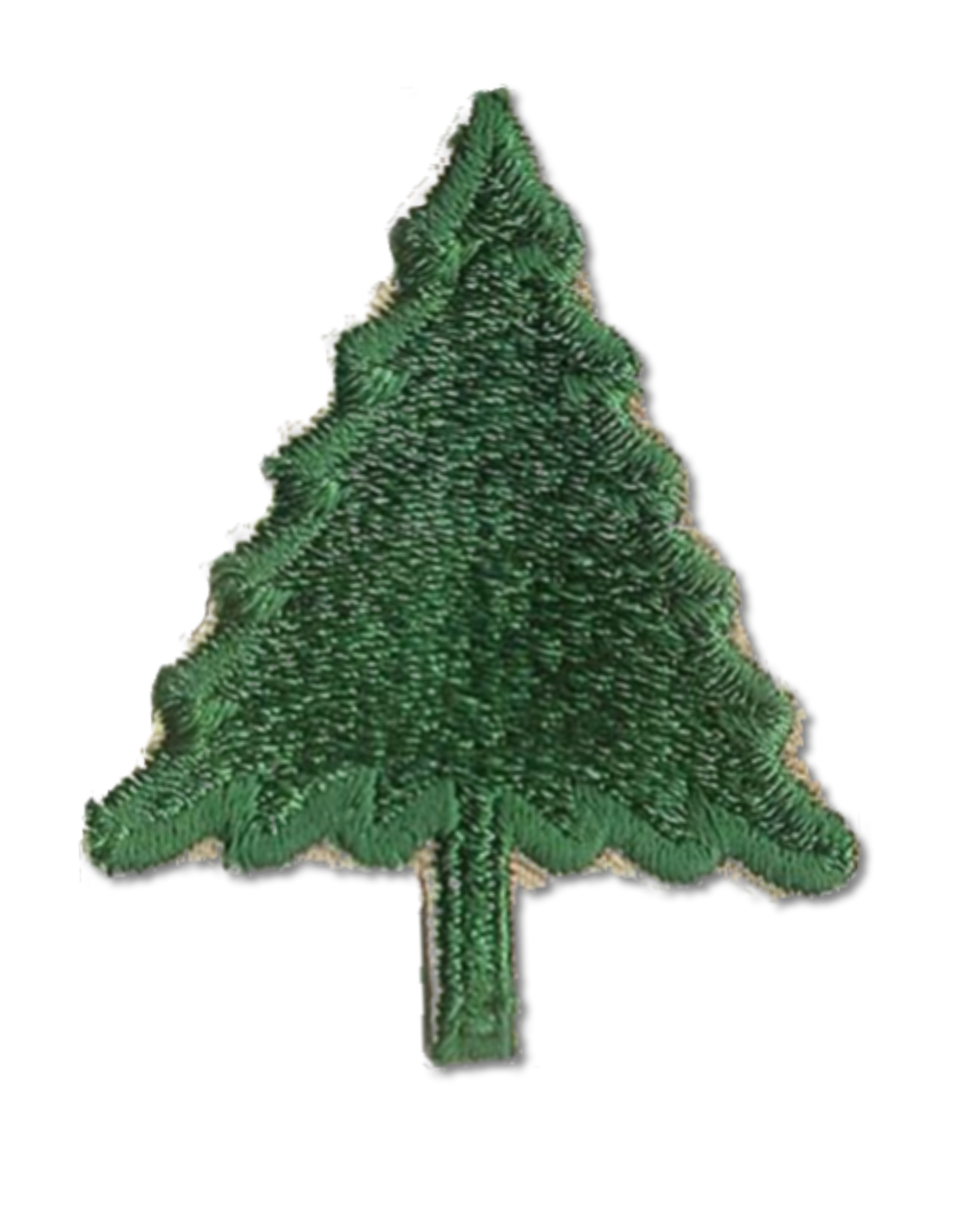

The 91st Reconnaissance Troop participated in the Rome-Arno (22 Jan 44 – 9 Sep 44), North Apennines (10 Sep 44 – 4 April 45), and Po Valley (5 Apr 45 – 8 May 45) campaigns. In July 1944, during the Arno Campaign of the Second World War, the 91st Reconnaissance Troop spearheaded Task Force Williamson under the command of Brigadier General E.S. Williamson, Assistant Division Commander for the 91st Division. The 2nd Platoon of the 91st Reconnaissance Troop and the 1st Battalion, 363rd Infantry were the first to enter Leghorn (Livorno) on its way to liberating Pisa.

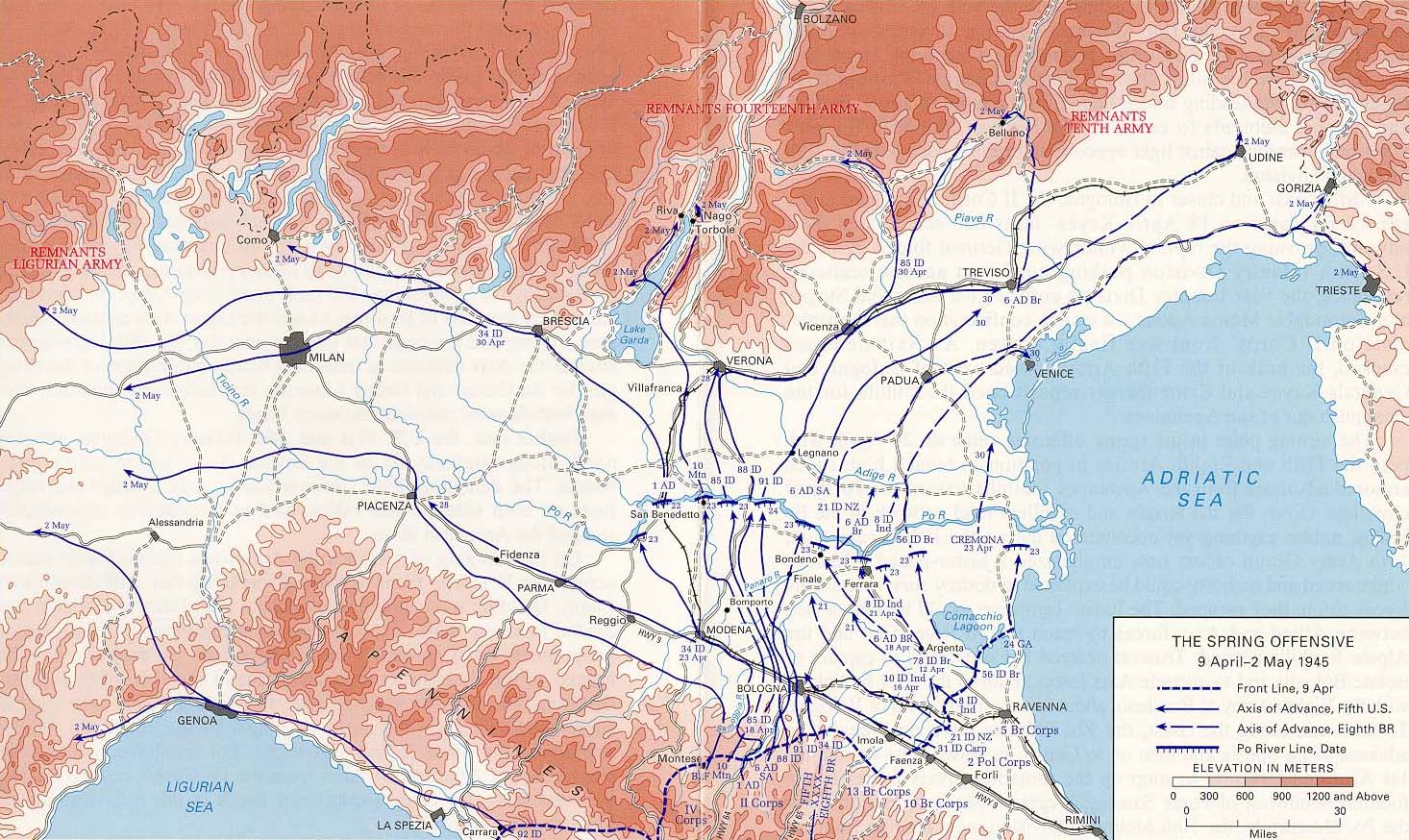

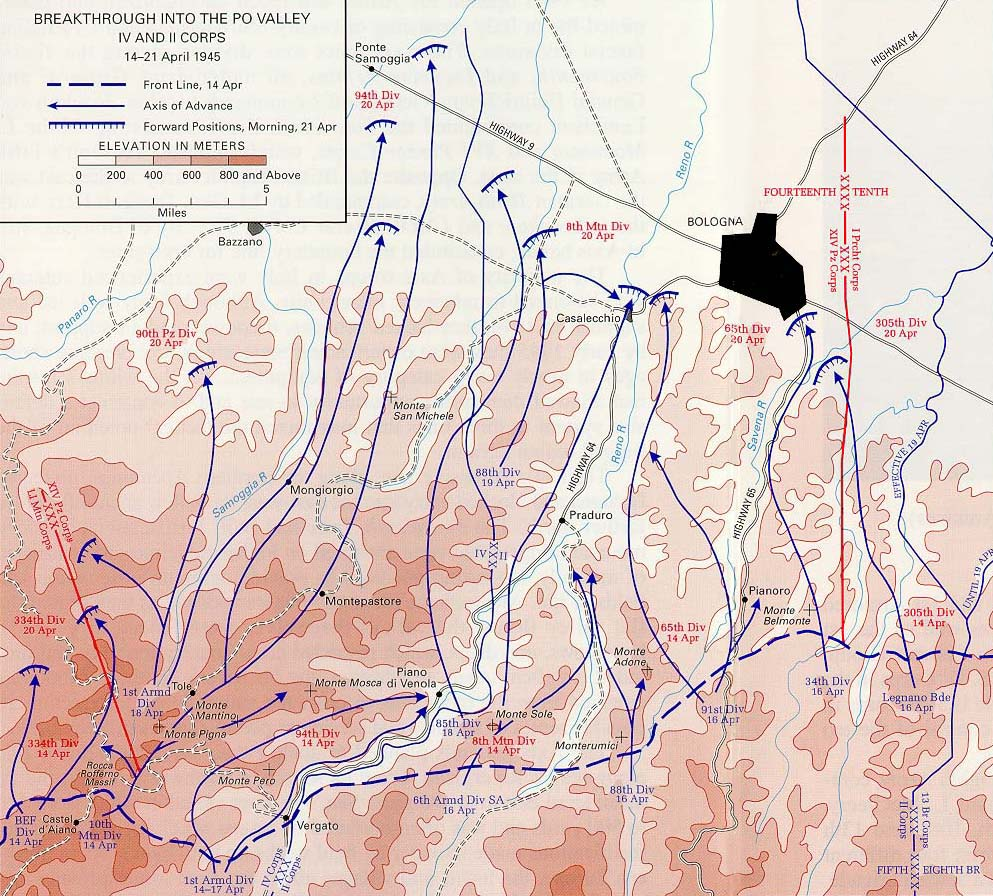
- The Troop was composed of:
  - Officers: 6
  - Enlisted Soldiers: 149
- Equipment:
  - M8 Greyhound: 13
  - M3 Half-track: 5
  - 1/4 Ton Jeep: 24
  - M3 submachine gun: 30
  - M1 carbine: 99
  - M1 Garand: 26
  - M2 Browning: 3
  - M1919 Browning machine gun: 13
  - M9 Rocket Launcher: 5
  - M2 mortar: 9
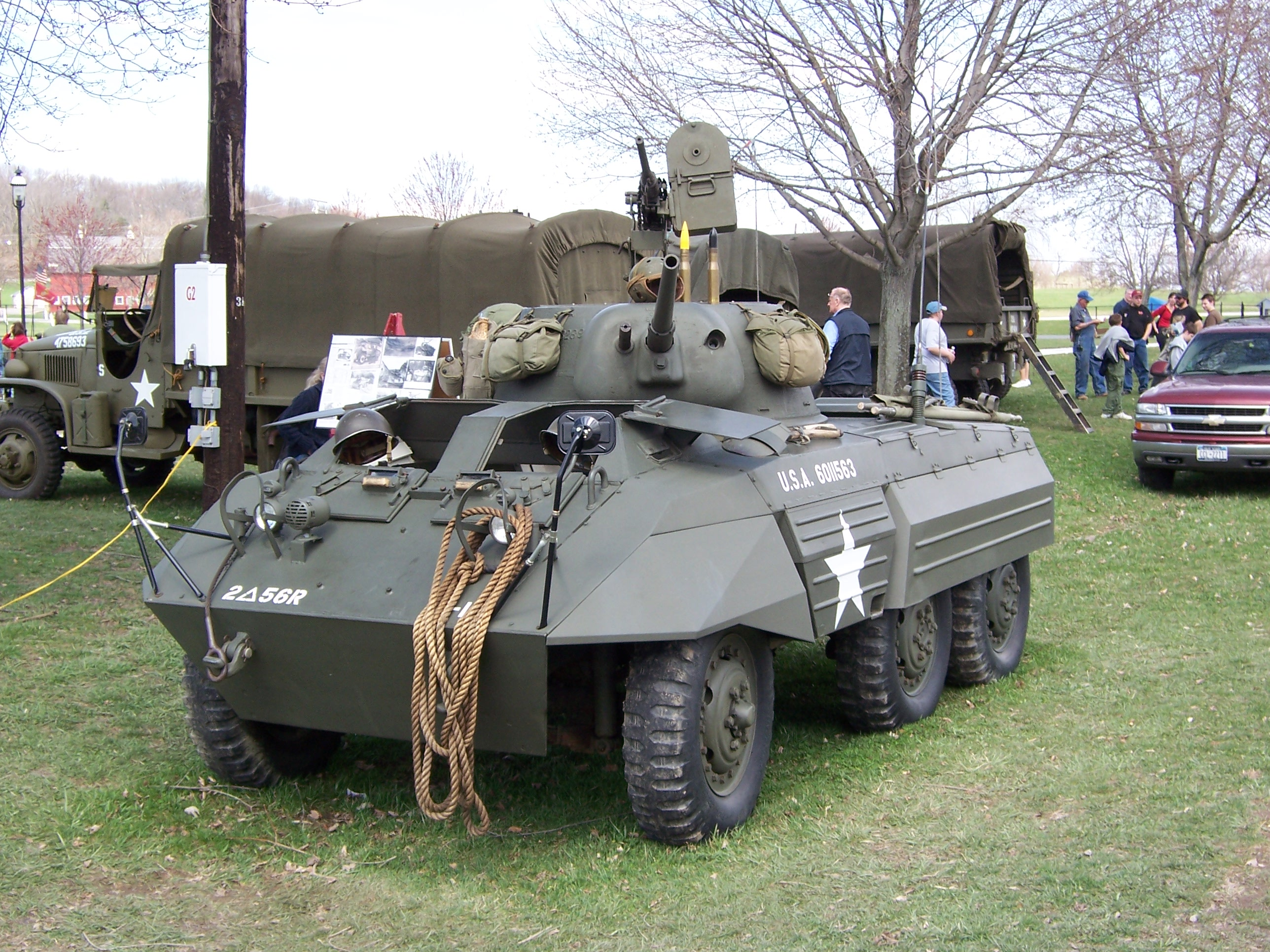

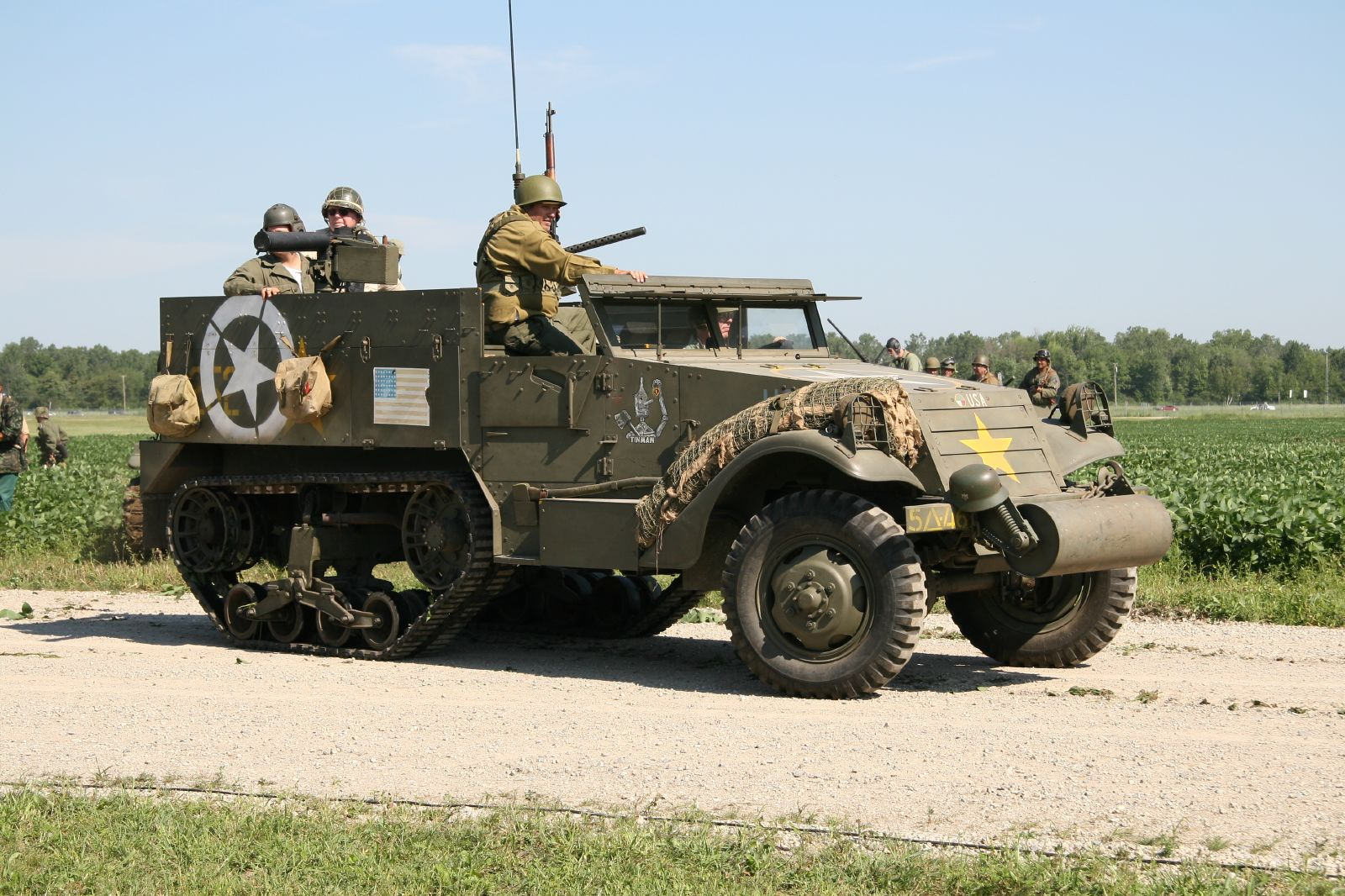

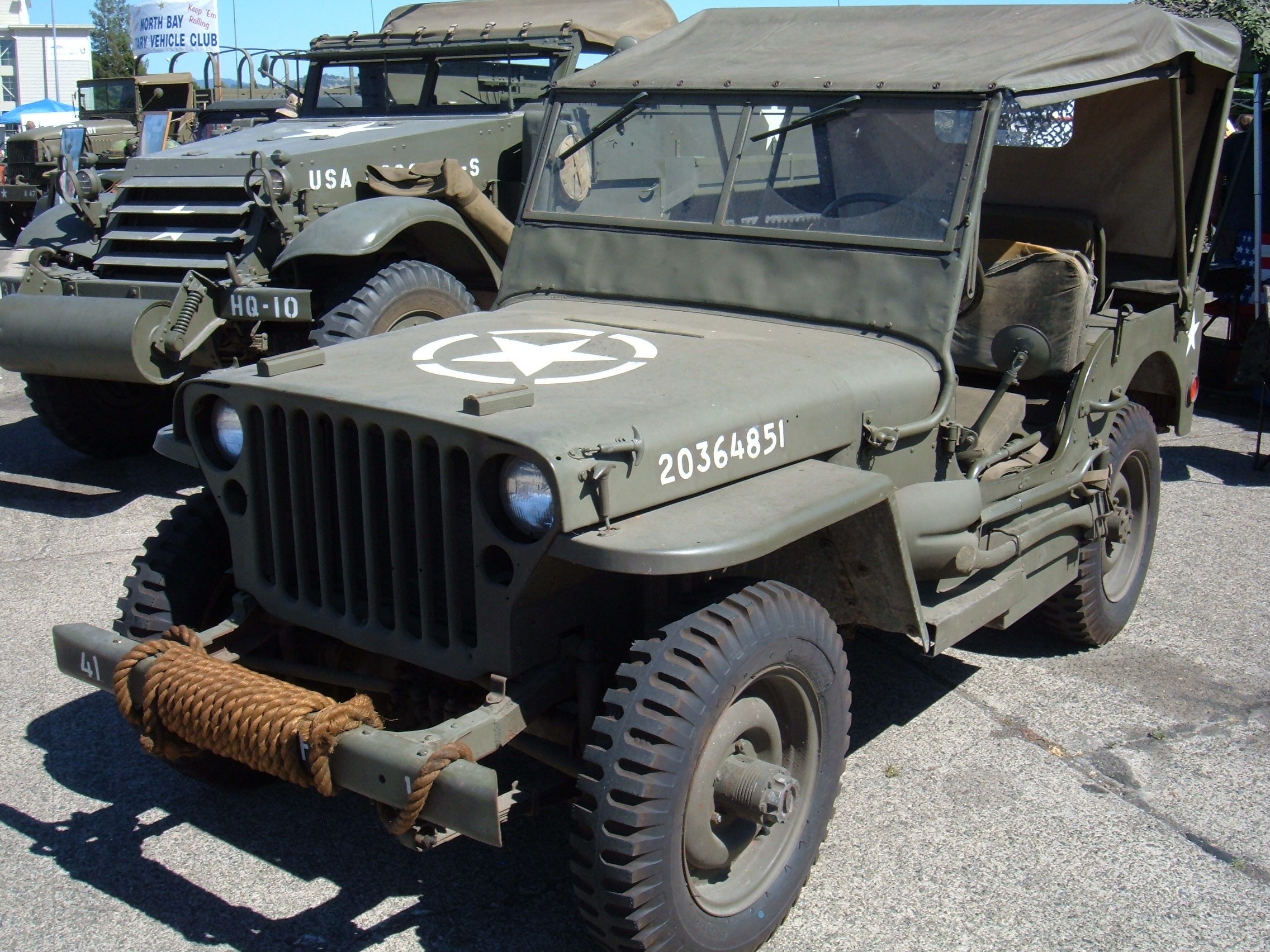

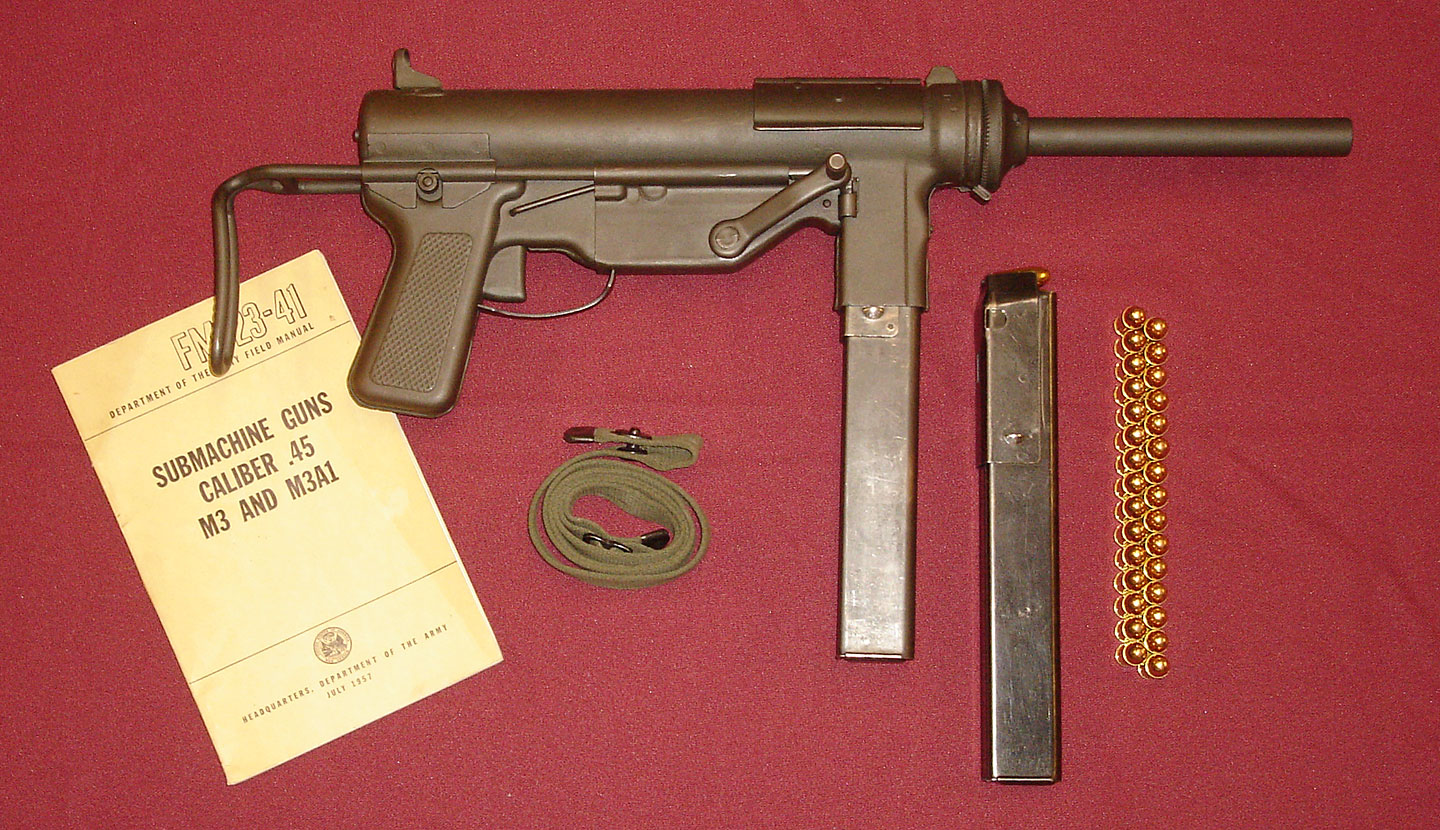

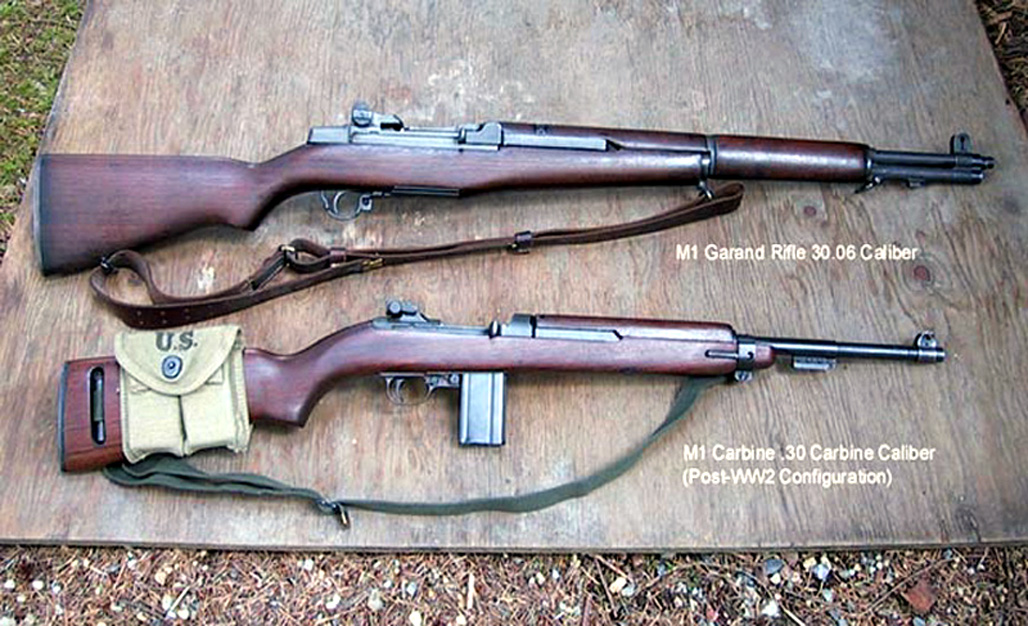

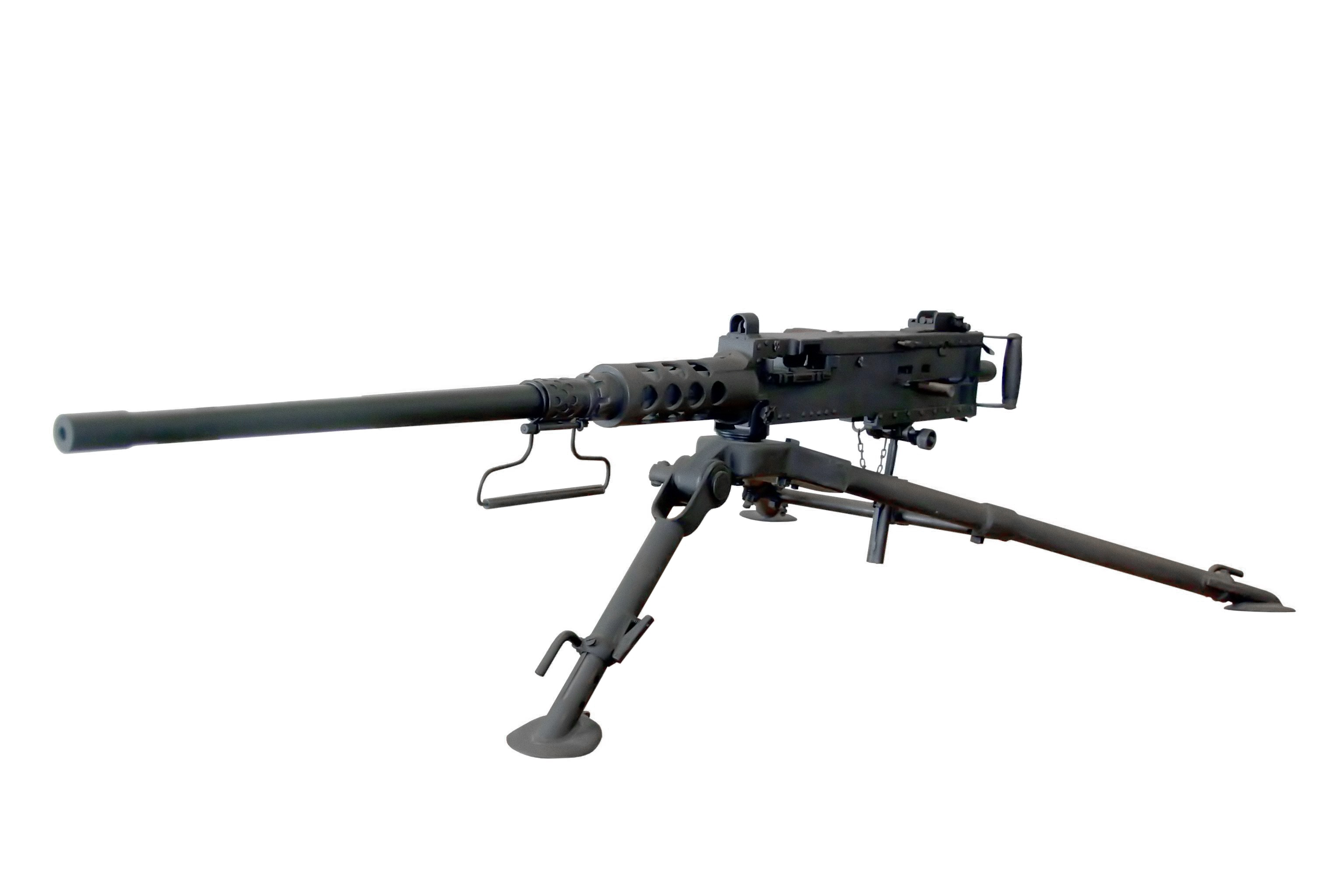

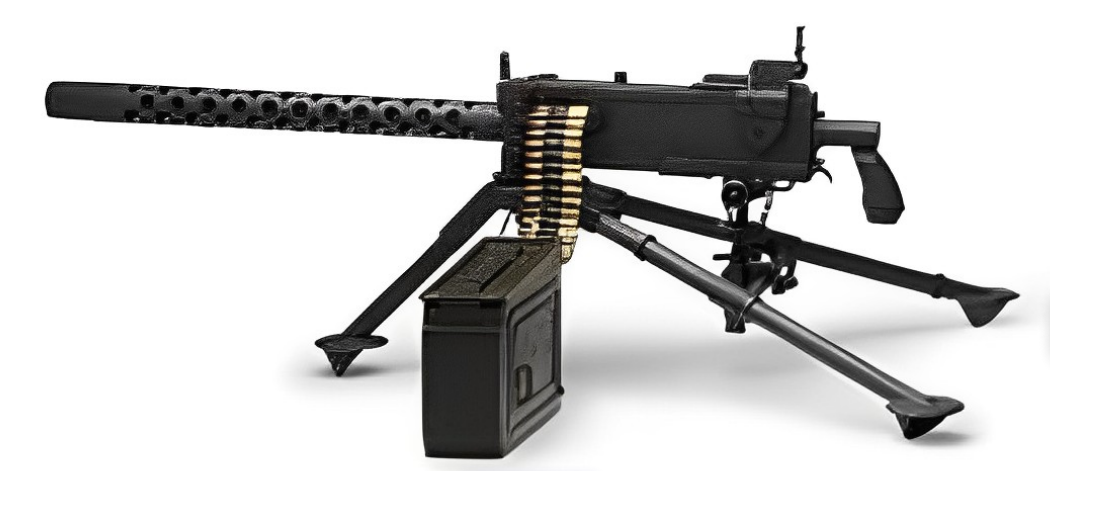

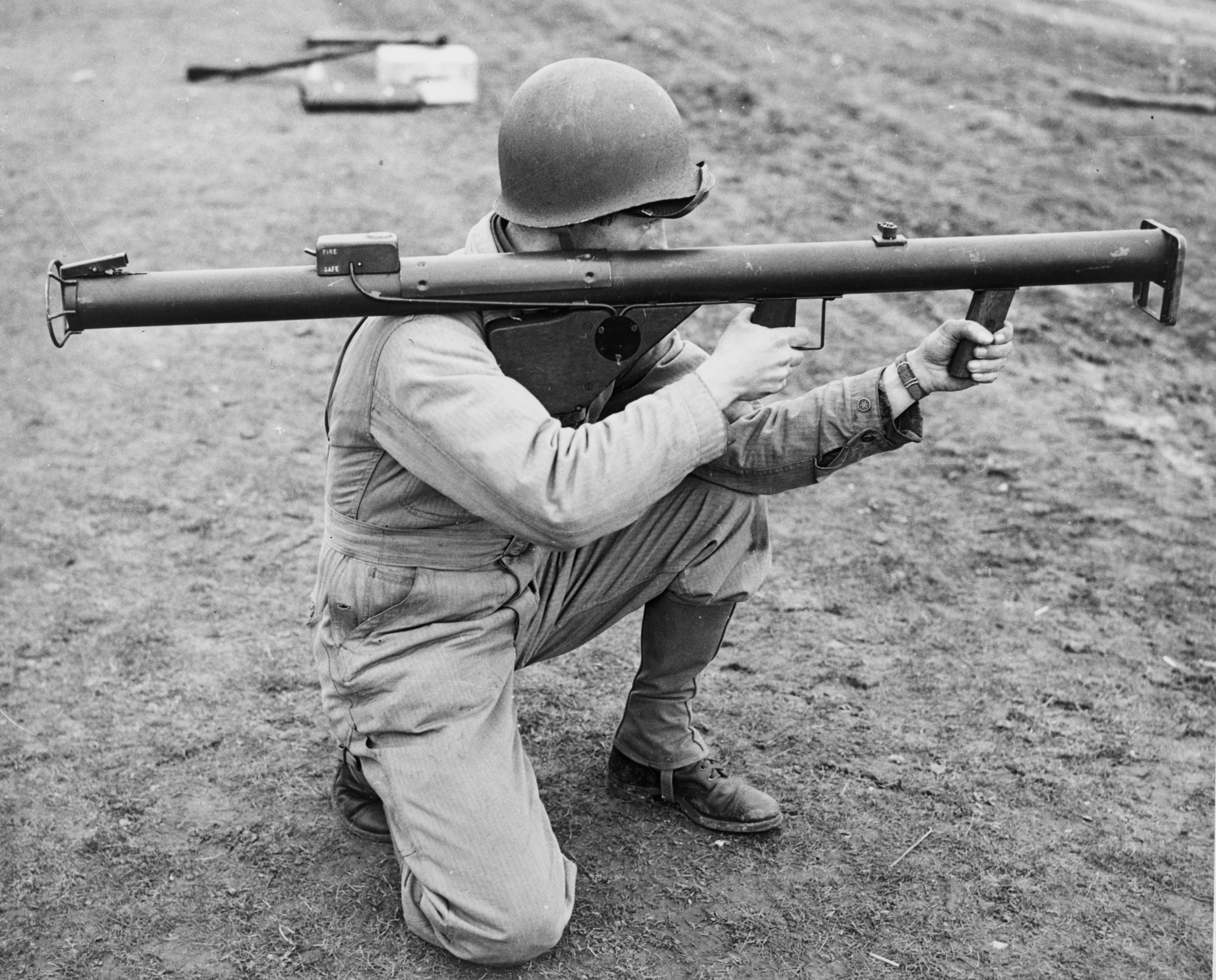

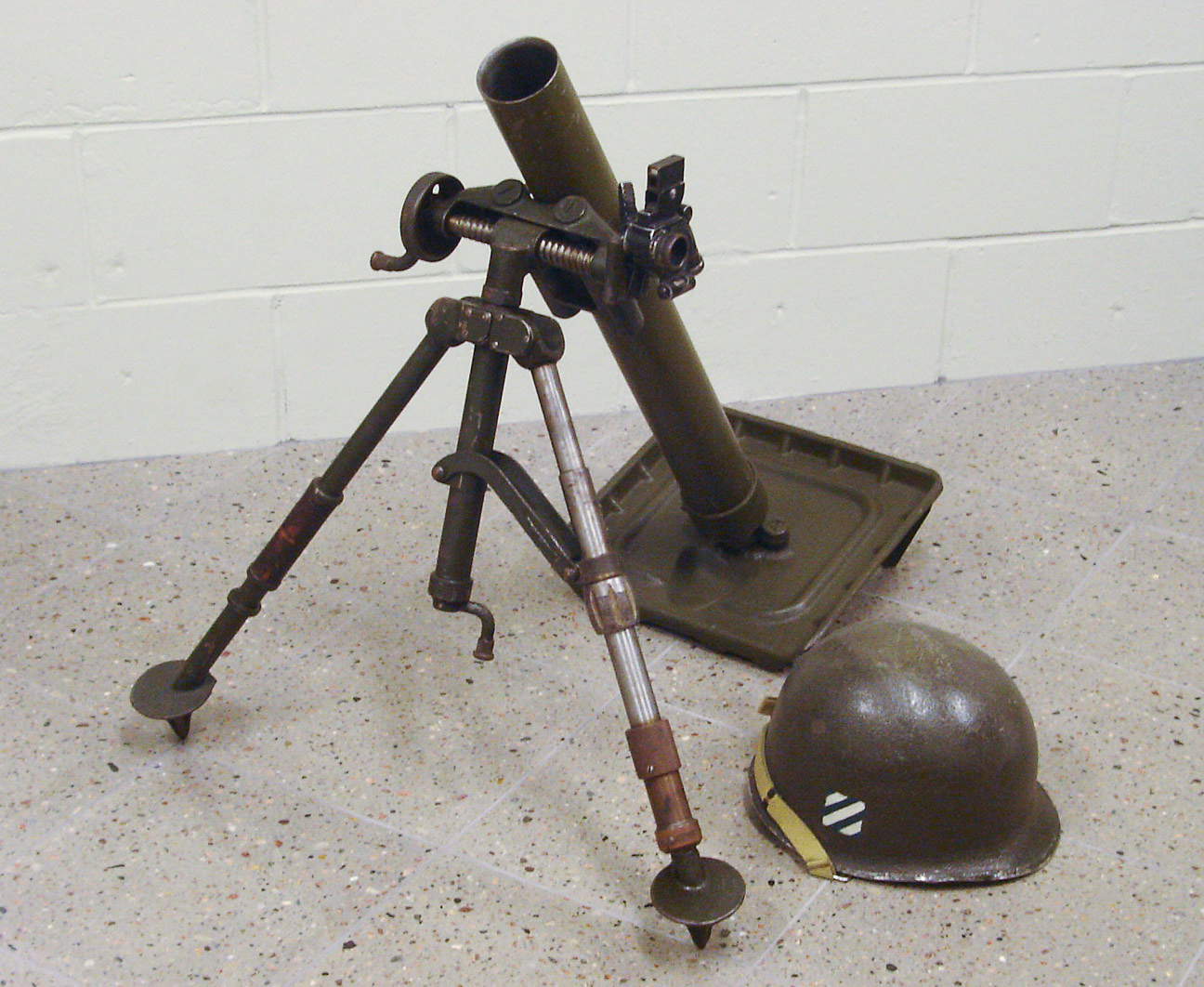

=== Post-War ===
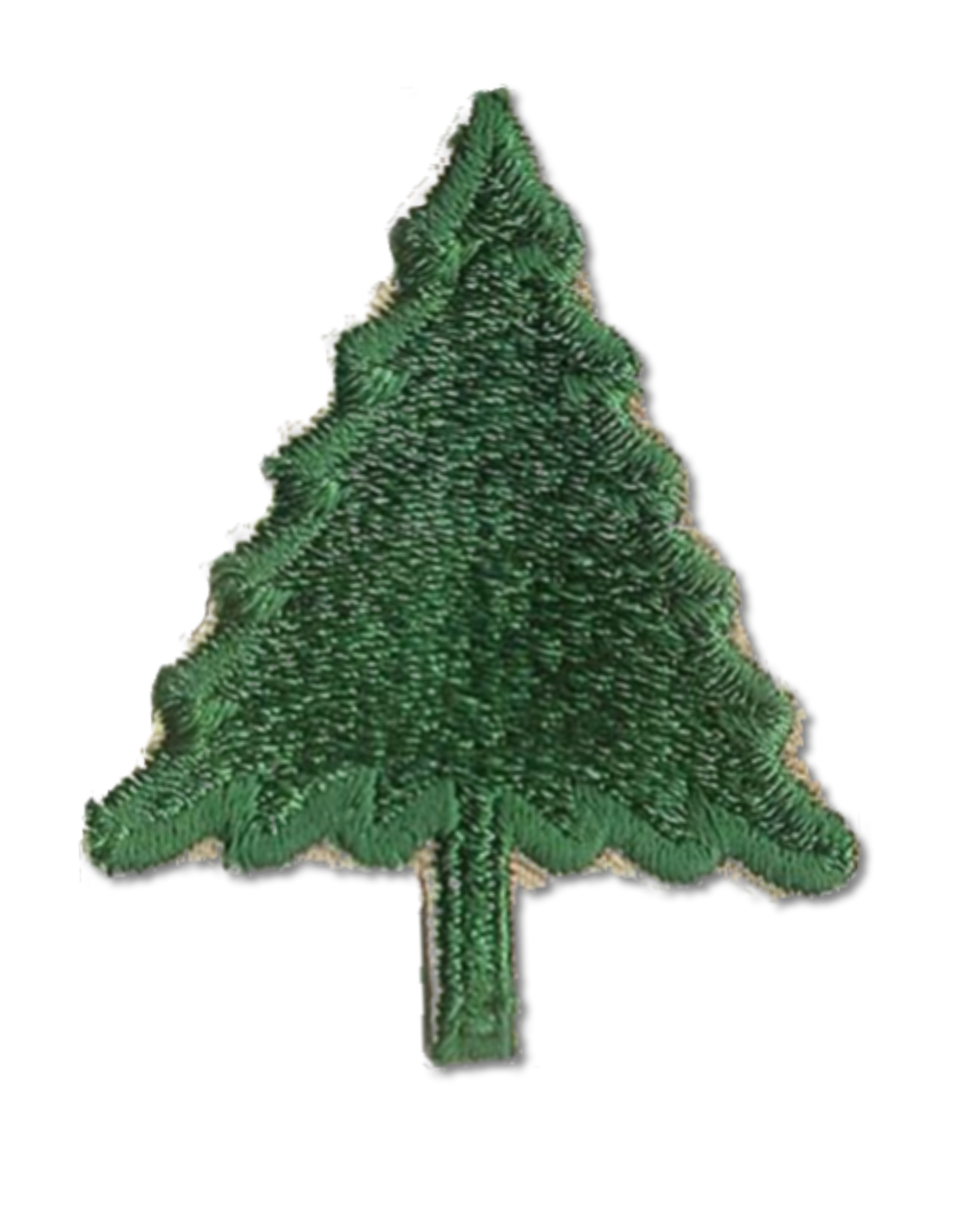

After VE Day, the Brigade was deactivated and reconstituted several times through 1945 as a headquarters and headquarters company and a reconnaissance troop. It was reactivated in 1947 as a mechanized cavalry reconnaissance troop; redesignated in 1949 as the 91st Reconnaissance Company.

The unit was active from April 1963 until December 1965 as the Headquarters and Headquarters Company, 2nd Brigade, 63rd Infantry Division. The 181st was stationed in Pasadena, California. This was in keeping with the plan to reorganize the Army Reserve to the new Reorganization Objective Army Division (ROAD) structures. The 63d was selected for retention and the reorganization was completed by the end of April 1963. The Brigade was composed of the Headquarters and Headquarters Company, the 3rd Battalion, 15th Infantry and the 4th Battalion, 27th Infantry. In November 1965 the last Army Reserve combat divisions were inactivated. From January 1966 through December 2006, the unit was inactive.

=== Operations as a Training Brigade ===
The 181st Infantry Brigade was reactivated at Fort McCoy, Wisconsin in December 2006. The Brigade trains soldiers, sailors and airmen to support contingency operations in the Global War on Terror. The 181st facilitates the Army Reserve's Combat Support Training Program (CSTP). The CSTP is composed of two exercises:the WAREXs (Warrior Exercise) focused on platoon level training, and the CSTXs (Combat Support Training Exercise) exercise that focus on Company level training in cooperation with the 86th Training Division and the 84th Training Command. Annually, the 181st provides its Battalions to serve as Observer/Controllers to the NTC and JRTC to evaluate Regular Army, Army Reserve and Army National Guard Combat Sustainment Support Battalions. Most years, the 181st provides Observer/Controllers to the Mission Command Training Program during their Warfighter exercises. The Brigade also provided Master Gunners and other subject matter experts to support Operation Cold Steel, a major initiative to improve the Army Reserve's gunnery training, from February through May 2018.

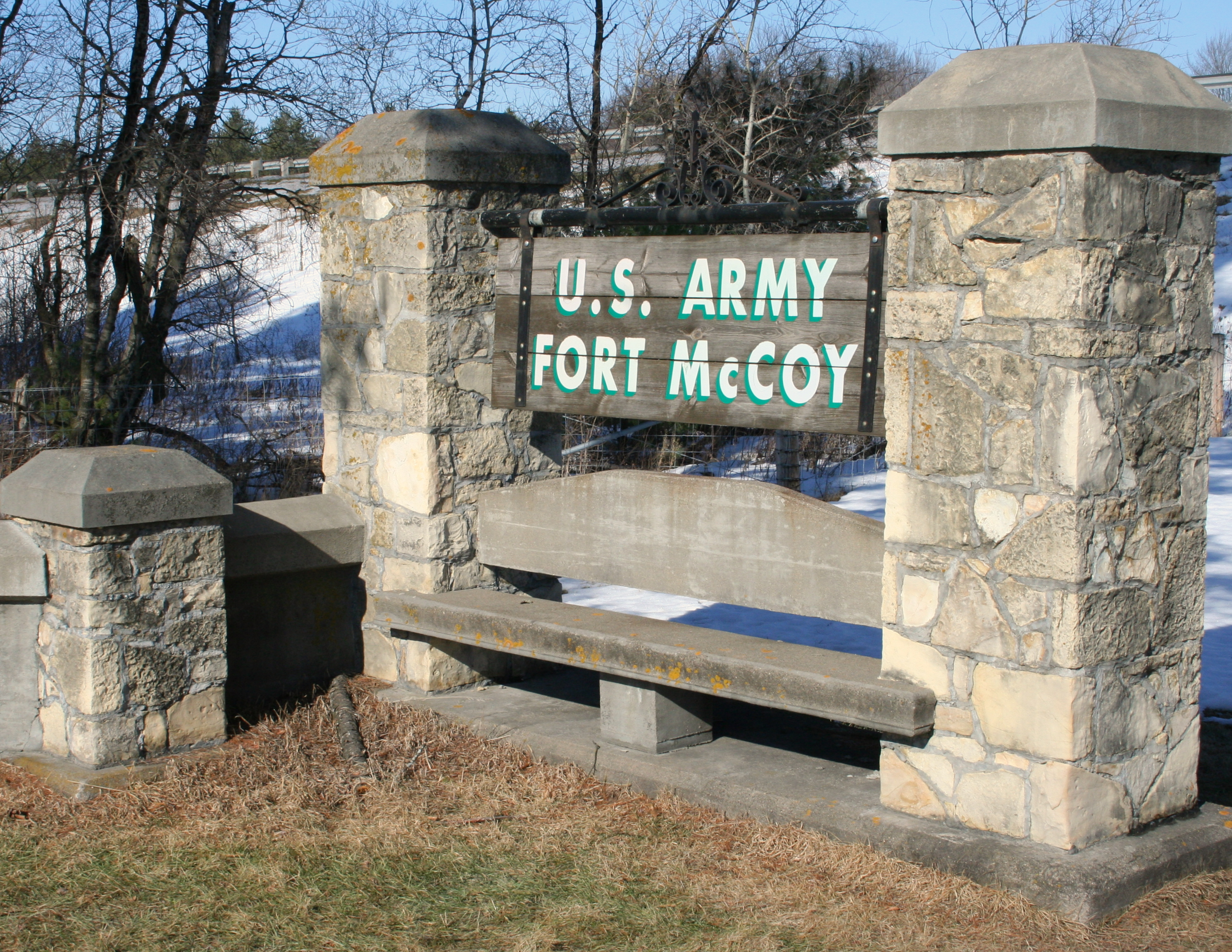
Fort McCoy historic gate

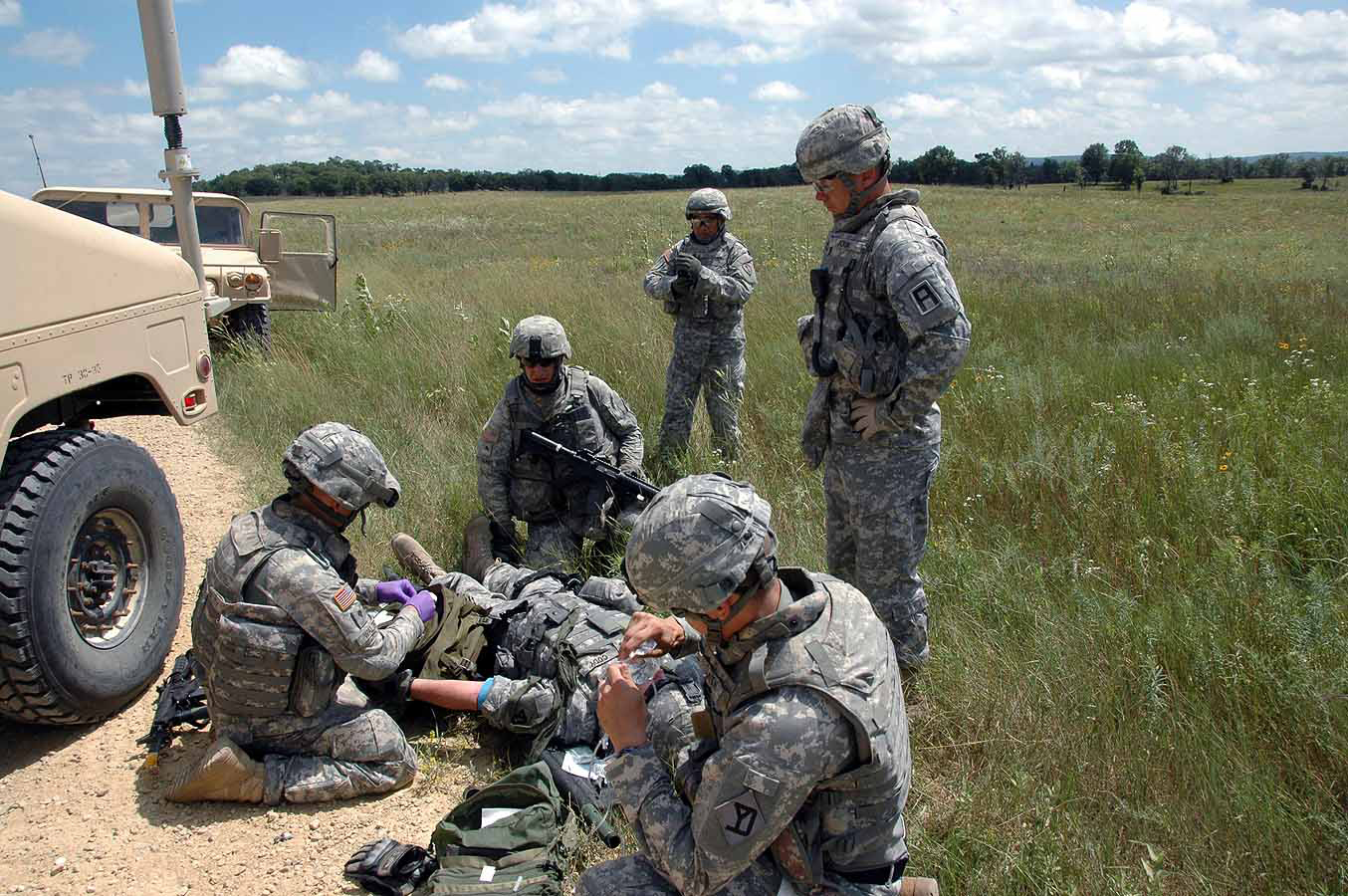
1-338th training deploying soldiers from the 101st Engineer Battalion September 2009

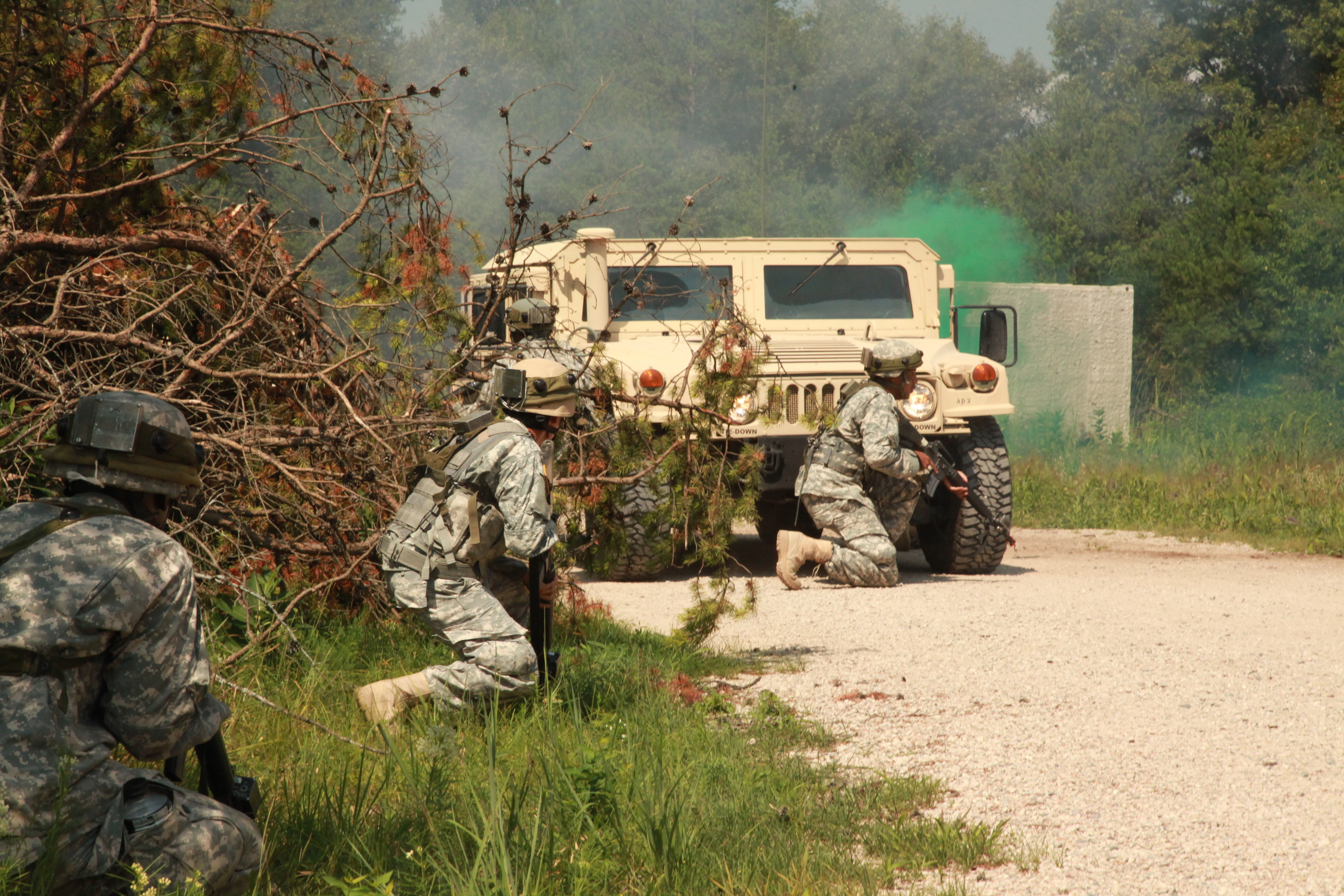
3-340th training the 824th Quartermaster Company (Heavy Airdrop Supply) during CSTX August 2015

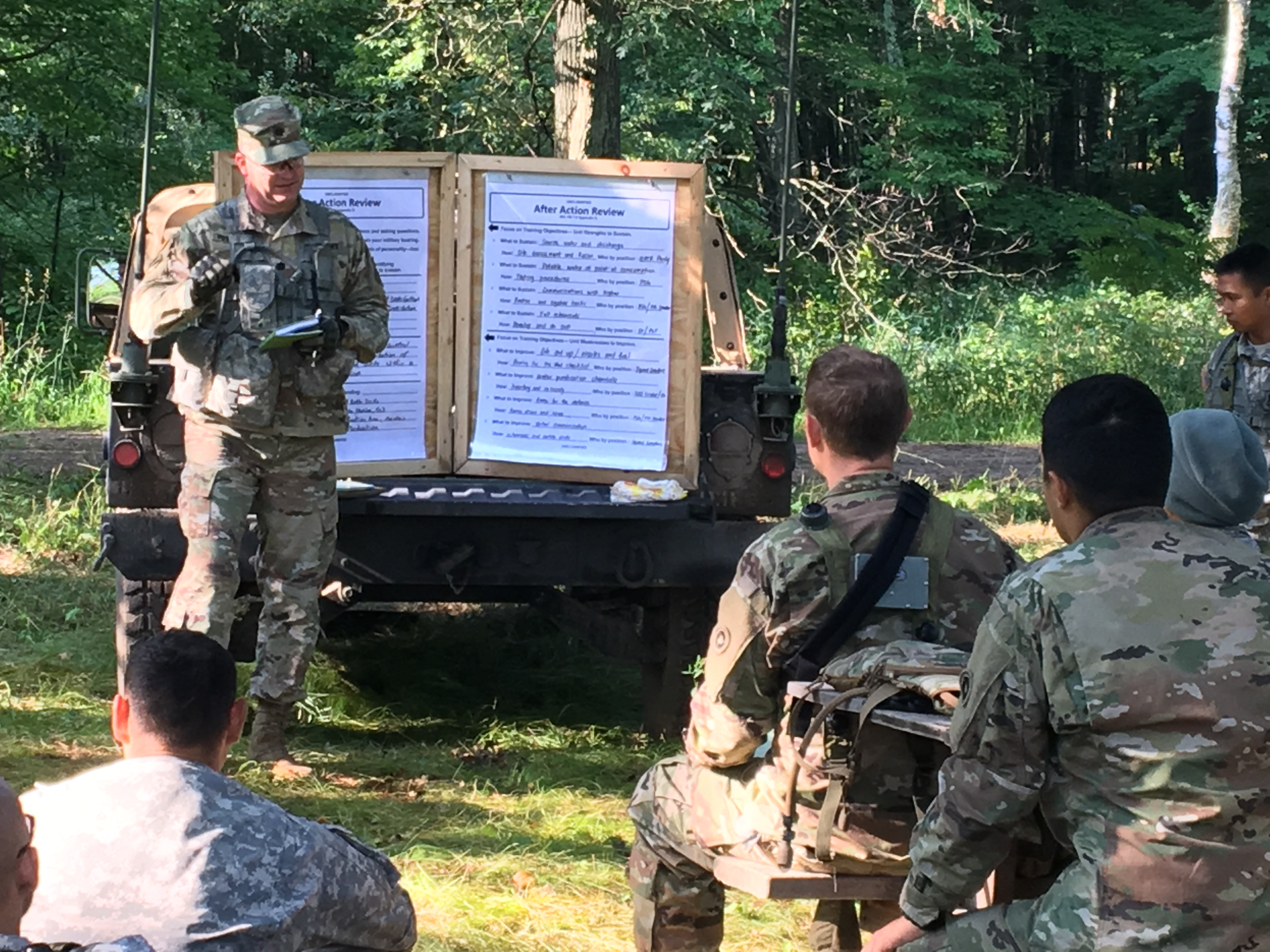
1-337th BSB Observer/Controller-Trainer conducts an After-action review at Camp Ripley during CSTX 86-17-03

=== Operation Allies Welcome ===
The 181st Infantry Brigade was ordered to support Operation Allies Refuge in August 2021. From August 2021 until February 2022, the Soldiers of the Brigade assisted in feeding, housing, clothing, and providing assistance to the more than 12,600 Afghans resettling in the United States.

== Campaign participation credit ==
Conflict	Streamer	Year(s)
World War I	Ypres-Lys	1918
World War I	Meuse-Argonne	1918
World War I	Lorraine	1918
World War II	Rome-Arno	1944
World War II	North Apennines	1944
World War II	Po Valley	1945

== Decorations ==
Ribbon	Award	Year	Orders
	Army Meritorious Unit Commendation	Afghanistan Retrograde 2021-2022	Permanent Orders 032-0001 announcing award of the Army Meritorious Unit Commendation
	Army Superior Unit Award	2008–2011	Permanent Orders 332-07 announcing award of the Army Superior Unit award

== Shoulder sleeve insignia ==

- Description: On a background equally divided horizontally white and red, 3 1/4 inches high and 2 1/2 inches wide at base and 2 1/8 inches wide at top, a black block letter "A", 2 3/4 inches high, 2 inches wide at base and 1 5/8 inches wide at top, all members 7/16 inch wide, all enclosed within a 1/8 inch Army Green border.
- Symbolism:
1. The red and white of the background are the colors used in flags for Armies.
2. The letter "A" represents "Army" and is also the first letter of the alphabet suggesting "First Army."
- Background:
1. A black letter "A" was approved as the authorized insignia by the Commanding General, American Expeditionary Force, on 16 November 1918 and approved by the War Department on 5 May 1922.
2. The background was added on 17 November 1950.

== Distinctive unit insignia ==
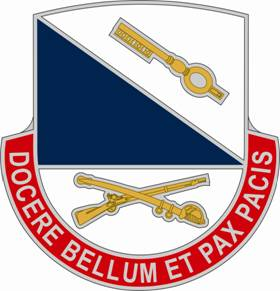

* Description/Blazon: A Silver color metal and enamel device 1 1/8 inches (2.9 cm) in height overall blazoned as follows: Per bend Argent and Azure, in chief a clevis (key) bendwise Or, wards upward and inward and on a base of the first, a rifle, muzzle upward and a saber, grip to base in saltire of the third. Attached below the device a red scroll inscribed "DOCERE BELLUM ET PAX PACIS" in Silver.

- Symbolism: The diagonal separation of colors denotes a line not crossed. The clevis (key) symbolizes the unit's long history and knowledge as being a key to winning the battle. The crossed rifle and saber allude to the Brigade's mission during World War II as the 91st Reconnaissance Cavalry Company. The motto translates to "To Win War and Peace."
- Background: The distinctive unit insignia was approved on 14 August 2007.
