= Attorney General Macdonald =

Attorney General Macdonald may refer to:

- Alexander Macdonald (British Columbia politician) (1918–2014), Attorney General of British Columbia
- Gordon MacDonald (American politician) (born 1961), Attorney General of New Hampshire
- John A. Macdonald (1815–1891), Attorney General of the Province of Canada
- John Sandfield Macdonald (1812–1872), Attorney General of Ontario
- Malcolm Archibald Macdonald (1875–1941), Attorney General of British Columbia

== See also ==
- Joseph E. McDonald (1819–1891), Attorney General of Indiana
- Ross McDonald (1888–1964), Attorney-General of Western Australia
