= John Bacon McDonald =

United States Army general

John B. McDonald
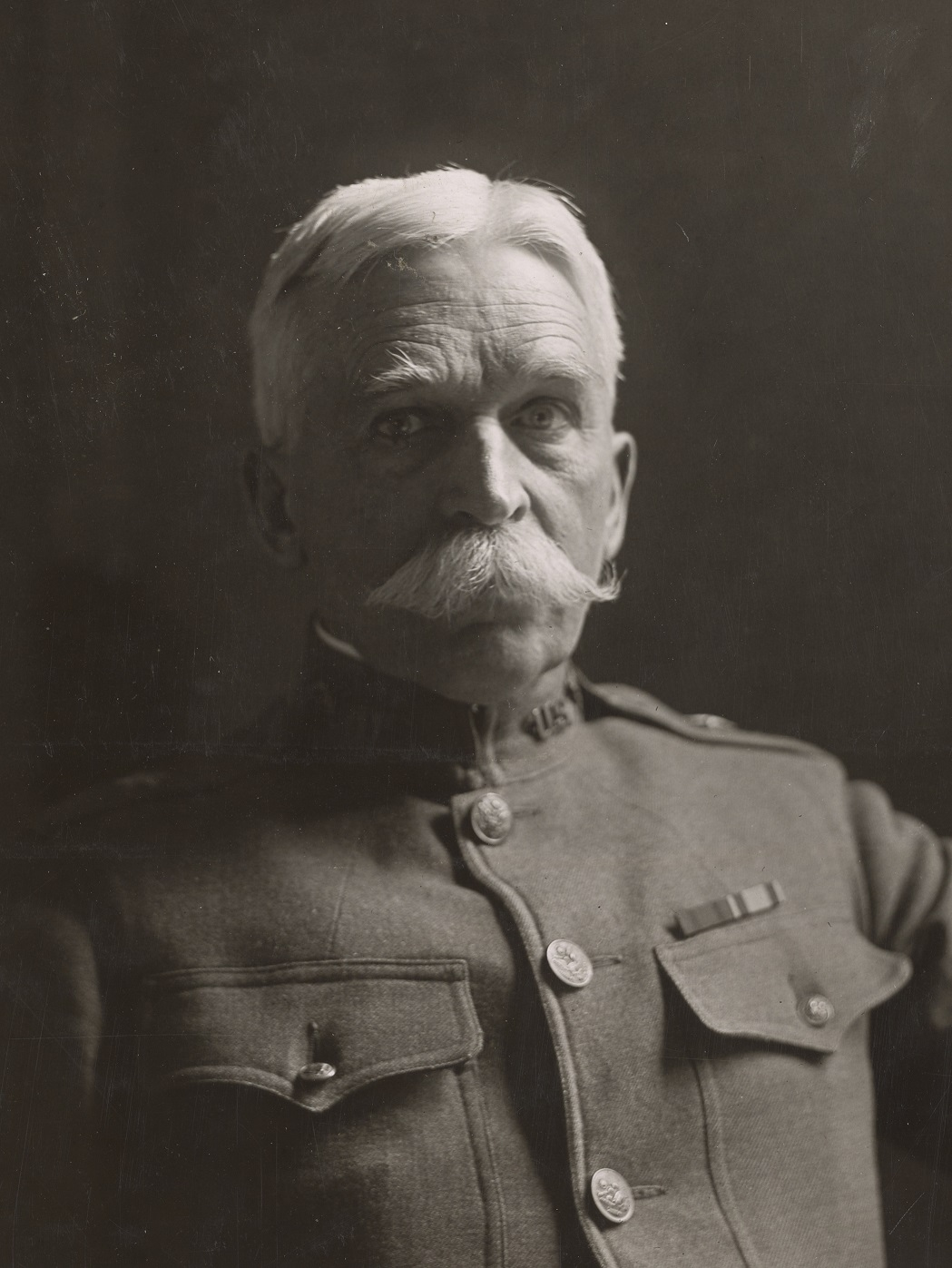
- Brigadier General John B. McDonald at the Inspector Generals office
- Born: February 8, 1859; Athens, Alabama, United States
- Died: March 15, 1927 (aged 68); Washington, D.C., United States
- Burial place: Arlington National Cemetery
- Military career
- Allegiance: United States
- Branch: United States Army
- Service years: 1881–1922
- Rank: Brigadier General
- Unit: Cavalry Branch
- Commands: 181st Infantry Brigade
- Awards: Silver Star; Distinguished Service Cross; Distinguished Service Medal; World War I Victory Medal; Croix de Guerre

Brigadier General John Bacon McDonald (February 8, 1859 – March 15, 1927) was a senior officer of the United States Army. He was involved in conflicts in the American Western Frontier, the Philippines, and World War I, where he commanded the 181st Infantry Brigade in several battles while serving on the Western Front.

== Biography ==
John B. McDonald graduated, 52nd in a class of 53 from the United States Military Academy in 1881 and was stationed with the 25th infantry at Fort Randall, but was transferred to the 10th Cavalry in Texas a year later.

He taught Military Science and Tactics from 1888 to 1890 in Auburn, Alabama, before he became quartermaster with the 10th Cavalry in Fort Grant, Arizona 1891. He held the quartermaster position in different Forts, before becoming Professor of Military Science and Tactics at the Military College of South Carolina from 1897 to 1898. He was promoted to captain in 1898. With the start of the Spanish–American War in 1898, McDonald became lieutenant colonel with the 1st Alabama Volunteer Infantry and was honourably mustered out after the end of the conflict in October 1898.

During the Philippine–American War in June 1901, McDonald was injured in a battle in the Santa Lucia municipality. Although he got shot through the lung at the beginning of the fight, he concealed his injury from his subordinates until the battle was over. For this action, he was later awarded the Silver Star.

He became a major with the 15th Cavalry in 1907 and was appointed as commander for Fort Ethan Allen the next year.

=== World War I ===
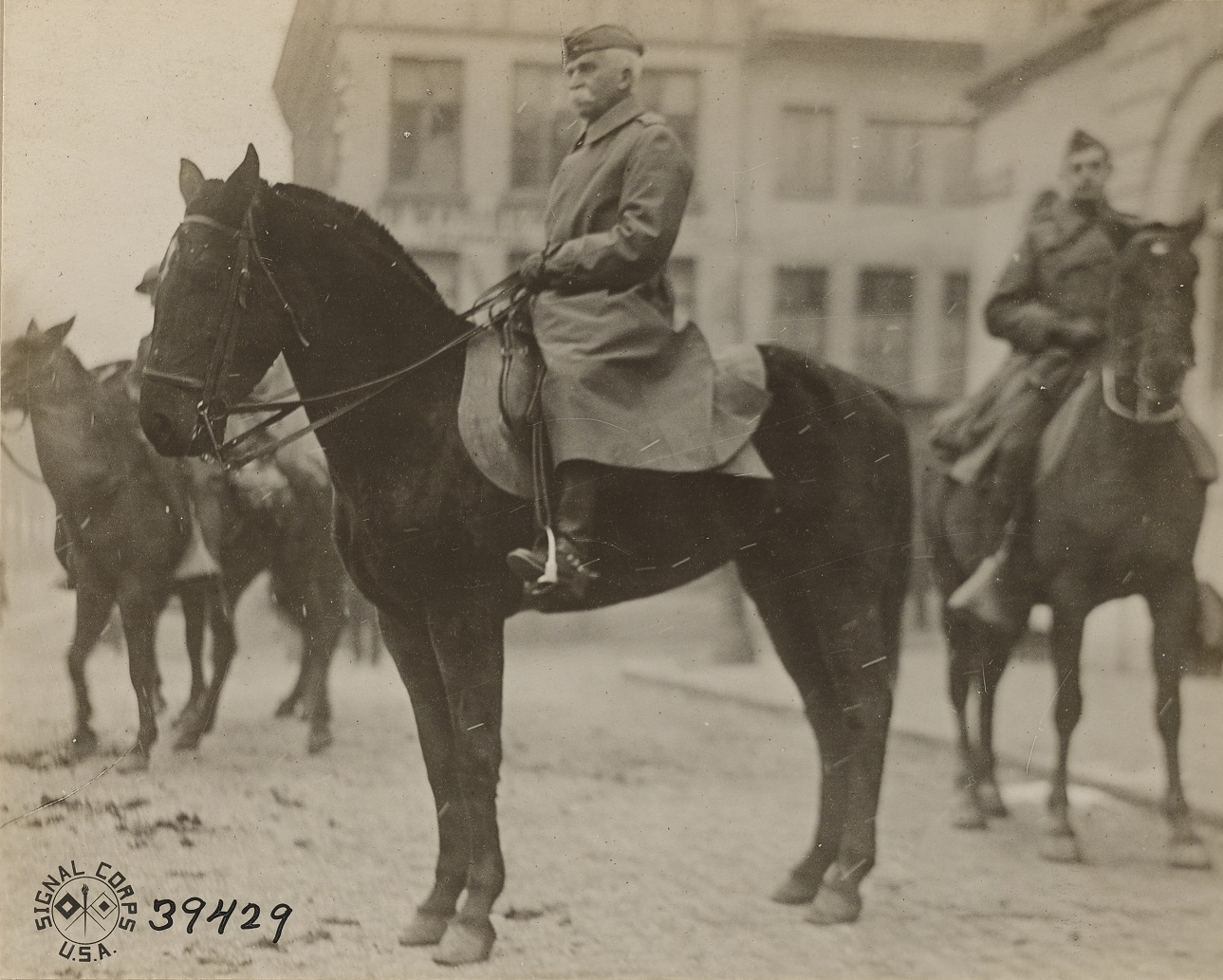
Brig. General McDonald as commander of the 181st Infantry Brigade in Oudenaarde in 1918.

After he had held different commands, John McDonald joined the Inspector-Generals Office in 1914.

In 1917 he got a temporary promotion to brigadier general and was part of the American Expeditionary Forces in World War I. He commanded the 181st Infantry Brigade with the 91st Division during the Battle of Saint-Mihiel, the Meuse-Argonne Offensive and the Battle of the Lys. He returned with his brigade to the United States in April 1919.

=== Post War ===
After the end of World War I, John B. McDonald had several posts, including commander of the Pacific Branch of U. S. Disciplinary Barracks on Alcatraz Island until 1922.

John B. McDonald died on March 15, 1927, in Washington, D.C.
