= Battle of Chochiwon =

Part of the Korean War

Coordinates: 36.6028°N 127.3042°E

- Part of Korean War
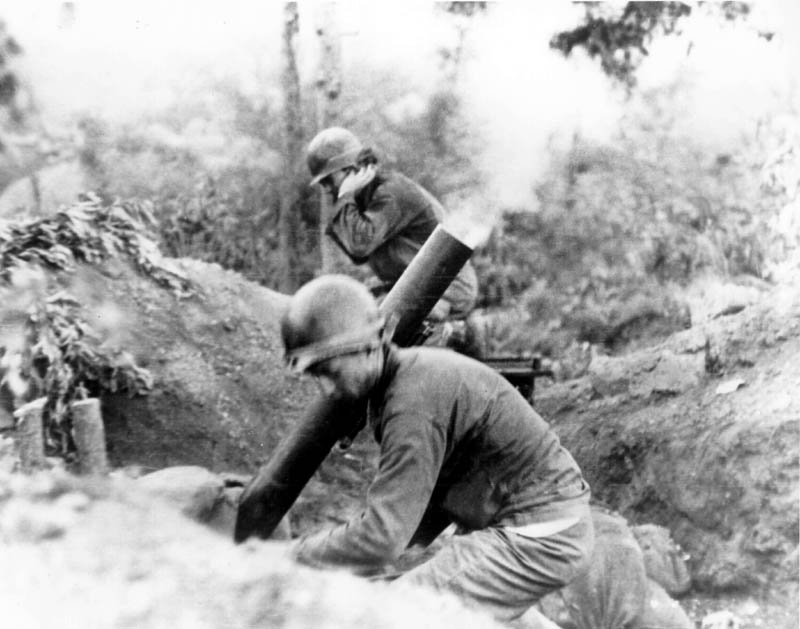
- An American mortar crew fires on North Korean positions at Jochiwon, July 11
Date	July 9–12, 1950
Location	Jochiwon, South Korea
Result	North Korean victory

Belligerents
United Nations: United States	North Korea

Commanders and leaders
Richard W. Stephens	Lee Kwon Mu

Units involved
21st Infantry Regiment	4th Infantry Division: 16th Infantry Regiment; 18th Infantry Regiment; 105th Armored Division: 107th Tank Regiment

Strength
2,000	20,000

Casualties and losses
259 killed 230 POW; 36 Missing; 9 Tanks destroyed	262 vehicles reported destroyed (Note: Though unconfirmed, this number is believed to be an exaggeration.)

The Battle of Chochiwon was an early engagement between United States and North Korean forces during the Korean War, taking place in the villages of Jeonui-myeon and Jochiwon (then spelt 'Chochiwon') in western South Korea on July 9–12, 1950. After four days of intense fighting, the battle ended in a North Korean victory.

The United States Army's 21st Infantry Regiment, 24th Infantry Division was assigned to delay two advancing North Korean People's Army divisions following communist victories at Osan, Pyongtaek, and Chonan earlier in the month. The regiment deployed along roads and railroads between the two villages, attempting to slow the advance as much as possible.

Aided by air strikes, U.S. Army units were able to inflict substantial damage on the North Korean armor and other vehicles but were overwhelmed by North Korean infantry. The two understrength U.S. battalions fought in several engagements over the three days and suffered massive losses in personnel and equipment, but were able to delay the North Korean forces for several days, allowing the remainder of the 24th Infantry Division to set up blocking positions along the Kum River near the city of Dajeon.

== Background ==
=== Outbreak of war ===
On the night of June 25, 1950, 10 divisions of the North Korean People's Army launched a full-scale invasion of the nation's neighbor to the south, the Republic of Korea. Advancing with 89,000 men in six columns, the North Koreans caught the South Korean Army by surprise, resulting in a disastrous rout for the South Koreans who were disorganized, ill-equipped, and unprepared for war. Numerically superior, North Korean forces destroyed isolated resistance, pushing steadily down the peninsula against the South Koreans who could muster just 38,000 men to the front line to oppose them. The majority of the South Korean forces retreated in the face of the invasion; by June 28, the North Koreans had captured the capital Seoul and forced the government and its shattered forces to withdraw further southward.

Meanwhile, the United Nations Security Council voted to send assistance to the collapsing country, and United States President Harry S. Truman subsequently ordered ground troops into the nation. However, U.S. forces in the Far East had been steadily decreasing since the end of World War II, five years earlier. At the time, the closest force was the 24th Infantry Division of the Eighth United States Army, stationed in Japan under the command of William F. Dean. Tellingly, the division was under strength, and most of its equipment was antiquated due to reductions in military spending. Yet despite these deficiencies, the division was ordered into South Korea, tasked with taking the initial "shock" of the North Korean advances until the rest of the Eighth Army could arrive and establish a defense.

=== Early engagements ===
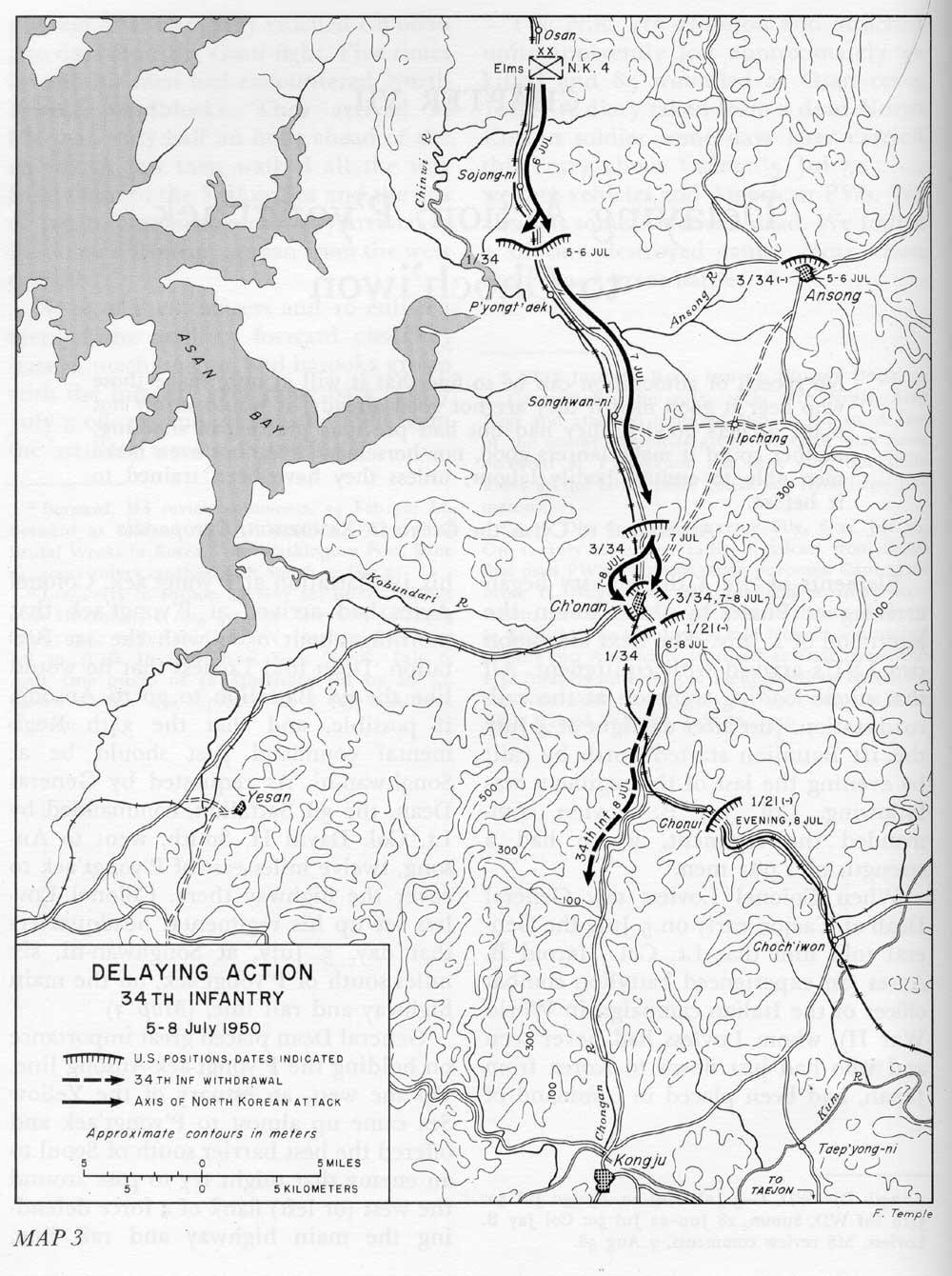
Map of the 34th Infantry Regiment's delay action from July 5 to 8. The 21st Infantry Regiment Battle position can be seen at the lower right of the map

The plan was to airlift one battalion of the 24th Infantry Division into South Korea via C-54 Skymaster transport aircraft and quickly block advancing North Korean forces while the remainder of the division was transported on ships. The 21st Infantry Regiment was identified as the most combat-ready of the 24th Infantry Division's three regiments, and the 21st Infantry's 1st Battalion was selected because its commander, Lieutenant Colonel Charles B. Smith, was the most experienced, having commanded a battalion at the Battle of Guadalcanal during World War II. On July 5, Task Force Smith engaged North Korean forces at the Battle of Osan, delaying over 5,000 North Korean infantry for seven hours before being routed and forced back.

During that time, the U.S. 34th Infantry Regiment set up a line between the villages of Pyongtaek and Ansong, 10 miles (16 km) south of Osan, to fight the next delaying action against the advancing North Korean forces. The 34th Infantry Regiment was similarly unprepared for a fight; in the ensuing action, most of the regiment withdrew to Chonan without engaging the enemy. The 1st Battalion, left alone against the North Koreans, resisted their advance in the brief and disastrous Battle of Pyongtaek. The 34th Infantry was unable to stop North Korean armor. After a 30-minute fight, the 34th mounted a disorganized retreat in which many soldiers abandoned equipment and retreated without resisting the North Korean forces. The Pyongtaek—Ansong line was unable to delay the North Korean force significantly or inflict heavy casualties on them.

The regiment subsequently retreated to Chonan, where, the next night, the 3rd Battalion was heavily engaged in another delaying action. The 34th Infantry lost its commander, Colonel Robert R. Martin, and two-thirds of its 3rd Battalion's strength. The exhausted 34th Infantry Regiment retreated to the Kum River, near the 24th Infantry Division's headquarters. The 24th Infantry Division would make one final delaying action before it would be forced to make its final stand around Taejon, the only major defensible city left before the Pusan Perimeter being established by the Eighth Army.

== Battle ==
Having pushed back U.S. forces at Osan, Pyongtaek, and Chonan, the North Korean 4th Infantry Division, supported by elements of the 105th Armored Division, continued its advance down the Osan—Chonan road, up to 12,000 men strong under division commander Lee Kwon Mu in two infantry regiments supported by dozens of tanks. Behind it, the North Korean 3rd Infantry Division had yet to engage the American forces.

=== Airstrikes ===
By July 7, the 21st Infantry Regiment had been established at Chochiwon, one of two roads to the Kum River and Taejon. The regiment was ordered to keep the road through the region open so supplies and ammunition could flow through it to the 34th Infantry Regiment on the front lines. The Americans spent several days unloading supplies from locomotives in the village. After blowing up all bridges north of the town, 1st Battalion was established on the Chochiwon road at Chonui, 12 miles (19 km) south of Chonan. Supporting it were one battery of 155-mm howitzers from the 11th Field Artillery Battalion and A Company of the 78th Heavy Tank Battalion with M24 Chaffee light tanks, as well as B Company of the 3rd Engineer Combat Battalion which was assigned to construct roadblocks and prepare bridges for demolition.

Around mid-afternoon on July 9, observers with the 1st Battalion, 21st Infantry, spotted a column of 200 vehicles led by 11 North Korean T-34 tanks, subsequently calling for an airstrike. For the next few hours, the U.S. Air Force ravaged the North Korean column with repeated bombings and strafing, and by sunset, half of the vehicles were destroyed or burning, and a large portion of the infantry had also been killed. The next day, a similar airstrike by B-26 Invaders, F-80 and F-82 Twin Mustang aircraft of the Fifth Air Force took place around Pyongtaek, with 38 North Korean tanks, seven half-tracks and 117 other trucks destroyed, in addition to a large number of infantry. Much of the village of Chonui was left burning, although South Korean soldiers and civilians had already abandoned it. In addition, the airstrikes caused some of the largest losses of North Korean armor of the war and were a major blow against the T-34 tanks, which had been so successful during previous encounters.

=== Fight at Chonui ===
Meanwhile, the 1st Battalion, 21st Infantry, back at Chonui remained understrength. Half of the force had constituted Task Force Smith at Osan. B and C Companies were thus still refitting at Chochiwon, leaving A and D Companies to hold the line with a handful of replacements to fill the extra positions. The battalion numbered around 500 men in total. The 1st Battalion emplaced on hills overlooking the south road of Chonui, northwest of Chochiwon, and prepared to meet and delay the advancing North Korean forces, while the 3rd Battalion emplaced behind it in reserve. Around 0555 on July 10, the Americans began to detect North Korean movement through the morning fog. Fifteen minutes after daybreak, a whistle blew, immediately followed by small arms fire on the American positions. American forces at first fired indiscriminately into the fog until the regimental commander, Richard W. Stephens, stopped them. At 0700, the 1st Battalion then came under heavy mortar fire, and A Company on the leftmost ridge was assailed with fire from higher ground by North Korean forces of the 4th Infantry Division. The American forces began using 4.2-inch mortars on the North Korean positions to prevent them from advancing directly on their positions. Around 0800, the fog began to lift, and the Americans spotted four T-34 tanks in the village and subsequently called for another airstrike.

North Korean forces, meanwhile, flanked the American positions under cover of fog. The Koreans passed around the Americans' right flank and attacked the mortar positions in the rear. T-34 tanks also joined in the fight and also passed around the American flanks while obscured by the fog. Around 0900, the North Korean forces in Chonui initiated a frontal assault on the 1st Battalion, 21st Infantry's positions. An observer with the unit called in artillery and pushed back the North Korean infantry inflicting heavy casualties on the assaulting force. By 1100, the North Korean infantry, supported by several T-34s, was pressing on A Company's position, which was undermanned. At 1125, the requested airstrike came in; American aircraft rocketed the T-34s to no effect while strafing the Korean forces attacking A Company. The aircraft were able to push back the attack for several minutes before running out of ammunition and being forced to leave. The North Korean troops immediately resumed their assault.

One of A Company's platoons, under the command of Lieutenant Ray Bixler, faced most of the pressure of the North Korean assault. Tank fire had destroyed the American wire communications to their artillery, which began to fall on their own positions, believing that they had been overrun with North Koreans before Stephens could call it off. In the meantime, at 1135, Bixler's platoon was surrounded and destroyed; most of the platoon's men were killed in their foxholes by the North Korean infantry. Following this, men on the right flank began deserting their positions regardless of Stephens' efforts to keep them there. Finally, at 1205, Stephens ordered his men to withdraw. American forces had great difficulty retreating through the wet rice paddies, and a disorganized retreat followed as they attempted to pull back. During the retreat, several U.S. aircraft returned and, mistaking the soldiers of the 1st Battalion, 21st Infantry for North Koreans, began to strafe them. The aircraft inflicted no casualties, but the battalion overall had suffered 20 percent casualties, with 33 killed and 35 wounded during the engagement, as well as 14 killed in the mortar company.

=== American counterattack ===
As the 1st Battalion retreated, Stephens ordered the 3rd Battalion to counterattack the North Koreans on the ridge to regain the position. The American attack was aggressive, and the 3rd Battalion regained most of the ground, rescuing 10 Americans captured in the first attack in the process. During the attack, the 3rd Battalion uncovered evidence of North Korean war crimes; six men from the 1st Battalion's heavy mortar company were discovered executed, with their hands tied behind their backs. Several M24 Chaffee light tanks, newly arrived from Pusan, were brought in the 3rd Battalion's assault, the first use of U.S. armor in the war. The M24s disabled a T-34 while suffering two destroyed throughout the day. During this time, the North Korean 4th Division pressed southward, bypassing Chonui to the west. Following it was the North Korean 3rd Infantry Division, one day behind, granting the Americans time to rest and prepare new defenses. The 3rd Battalion held the position until just before 2400 when it withdrew to its previous position with most of the equipment that had been lost by the 1st Battalion earlier in the day. At that position, the men discovered North Korean forces occupying its old foxholes, and K Company engaged in a one-hour firefight to drive them off. Meanwhile, 1st Battalion withdrew south to new blocking positions 2 miles (3.2 km) outside of Chochiwon.

At 0630 on July 11, four T-34s advanced on the 3rd Battalion's position, passing through a minefield without suffering any casualties. Following the tanks, about 1,000 North Korean infantry of the North Korean 3rd Infantry Division conducted a double envelopment of the battalion, setting up roadblocks in its rear to prevent resupply and evacuation of wounded. Simultaneously, heavy mortar fire struck the battalion's command post, destroying its communications center and ammunition stocks and inflicting heavy casualties. American forward observers were unable to communicate with the artillery due to the lack of communications equipment. The attack by the North Koreans was well coordinated, and North Korean forces driven from the position in the night had likely been able to gather intelligence about the battalion's position. In the ensuing fight, American forces were overwhelmed again, fighting in desperate hand-to-hand combat.

North Korean machine guns continued to assault the American lines, and Americans who had expended their ammunition were forced to use their weapons as clubs. Of 667 men in the 3rd Battalion, over 60 percent became casualties, including the battalion commander, Lieutenant Colonel Carl Jensen, and much of the battalion staff. Shattered, the 3rd Battalion was forced to withdraw in small groups, many of its soldiers already captured or forced to escape on foot through the countryside back to American lines. Most of the retreating men were also captured. Remaining soldiers formed a provisional company of 150 for the retreat. Ninety percent of the battalion's equipment, including weapons and helmets, was lost. Another four of the M24 tanks were also destroyed without disabling any of the North Korean T34s.

=== Chochiwon falls ===
Under Smith, the 1st Battalion emplaced on hills overlooking the road into Chochiwon, resting the night of July 11 with no contact from the North Koreans until the next day. Just after dawn on July 12, the American battalion first encountered North Korean patrols. This was followed by an attack on their left flank by a North Korean force estimated as battalion-sized at 0930. Soon afterward, some 2,000 North Koreans began a direct assault on the 1st Battalion's position, supported by heavy artillery. Stephens decided the understrength battalion, with its large percentage of replacements, could not hold its position long and ordered it to withdraw. Smith subsequently moved the battalion from the line one company at a time, and the retreat was orderly. By nightfall, the entire regiment had moved by truck to a blocking position at Taepyong-ni, across the Kum River close to Taejon. In the meantime, U.S. forces on the westerly Kongju road fought a series of minor engagements to delay North Korean forces traveling down that road before retreating across the Kum River.

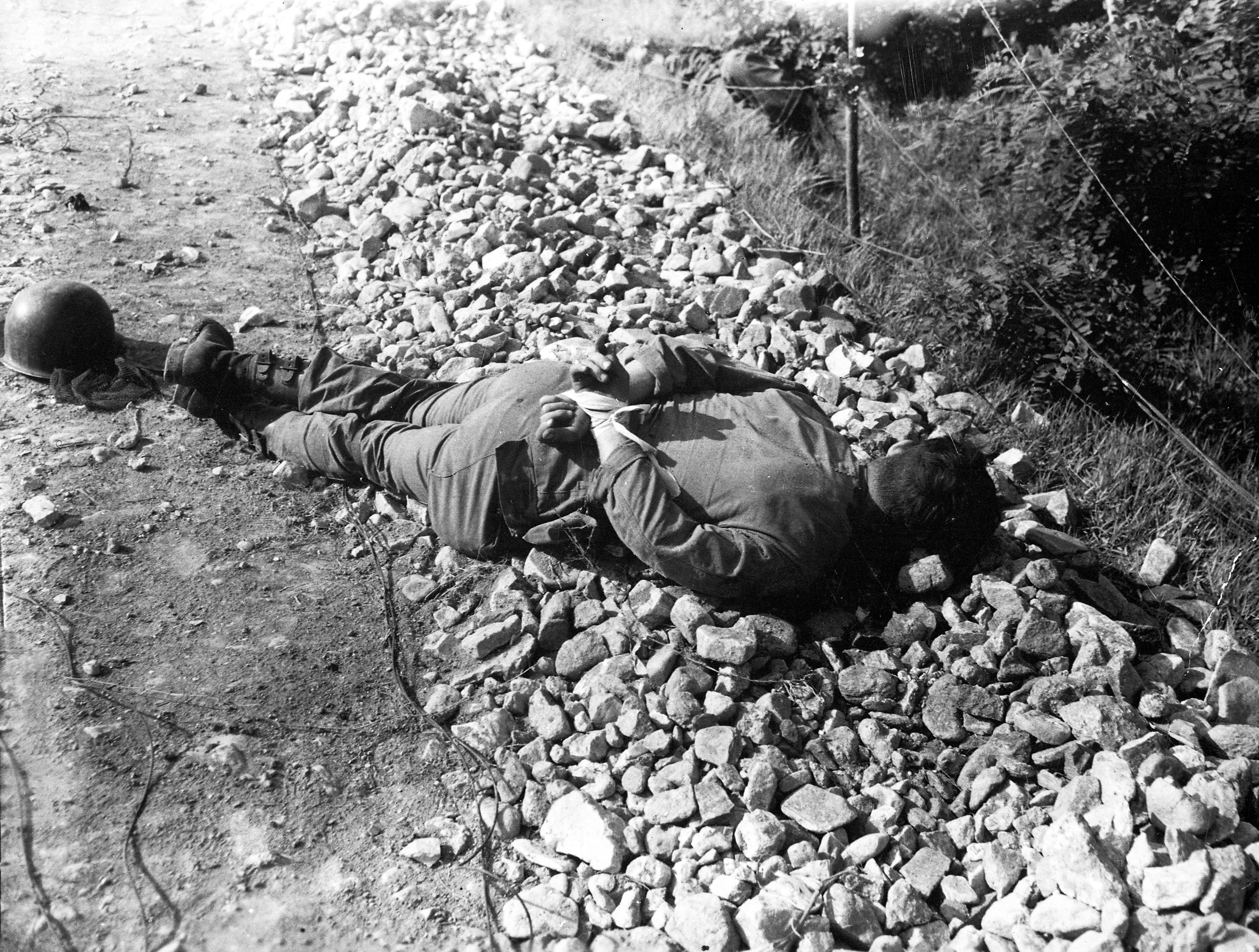
One of four Americans of the 21st Infantry Regiment found between the forward observation post and the front line. The men were probably captured the night of July 9 and shot through the head with their hands tied behind their backs. Picture taken July 10, 1950

== Aftermath ==
The U.S. 21st Infantry Regiment suffered 228 killed, 61 wounded, 215 captured, and 27 missing in the battle; a total of 531 casualties. Of those, 130 of the captured and 20 of the missing died. Additionally, 23 other American units engaged in the region suffered 31 killed, 79 wounded, 15 captured, and 9 missing; in total, a further 134 casualties. This brought the total number of casualties for the three days (10-12 July) as follows - KIA: 259, WIA: 140, POW: 230 (101 killed of the 175), MIA: 36 (20 killed of the 30) and made Chochiwon the bloodiest battle for American forces yet in the conflict, greater than the casualty counts at Osan, Pyongtaek, and Chonan combined. The loss of materiel was also great, with the 21st Infantry Regiment losing enough equipment and materiel to outfit two rifle battalions and enough clothing to equip 975 men. Against these losses, North Korean casualties could not be estimated due to a lack of communication among fighting units, which limited the value of American signals intelligence.

Despite these losses, the U.S. 21st Infantry Regiment was praised for its efforts to defend Chochiwon and Chonui. Roy Appleman, a historian for the U.S. Army, called it "the most impressive performance yet of American troops in Korea." Indeed, the regiment delayed North Korean forces for three days in the fighting, despite suffering heavily in casualties and equipment losses, and in doing so, the action bought enough time for the rest of the 24th Infantry Division to set up defenses around Taejon. The 21st Infantry Regiment subsequently joined the 34th Infantry Regiment and the 19th Infantry Regiment in setting up positions along the Kum River Line (Battle of the Kum River) near Taejon. The 24th Infantry Division would again be overrun and forced to retreat during the Battle of Taejon there over the next week. However, the delaying actions of the division would give the U.S. forces in Pusan time to set up the Pusan Perimeter, where the North Korean and UN forces would fight for several months in the Battle of Pusan Perimeter, eventually defeating the North Korean Army.
