= Kenneth R. Shadrick =

United States Army soldier

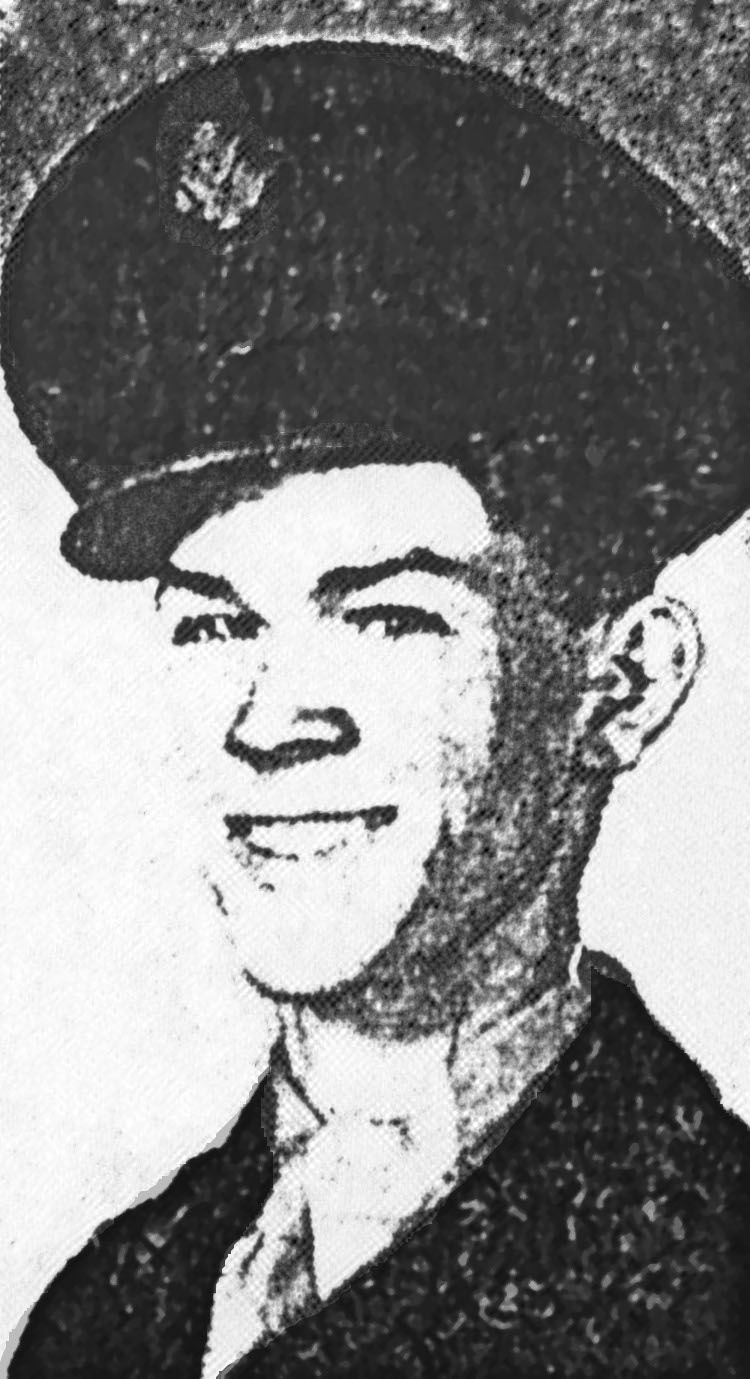
- Born: August 4, 1931; Harlan County, Kentucky, U.S.
- Died: July 5, 1950 (aged 18); Osan, South Korea
- Burial place: Wyoming, West Virginia, U.S.
- Military career
- Allegiance: United States
- Branch: United States Army
- Service years: 1948–1950
- Rank: Private
- Nickname: "Kenny"
- Service number: 15-273-308
- Units: 34th Infantry Regiment, 24th Infantry Division
- Conflicts: Korean War; Battle of Pyongtaek †
- Awards: Purple Heart

Kenneth R. Shadrick (August 4, 1931 – July 5, 1950) was a United States Army soldier who was killed at the onset of the Korean War. He was widely reported as the first American soldier killed in action in the war.

Shadrick was born in Harlan County, Kentucky, one of 10 children. After dropping out of high school in 1948, he joined the U.S. Army, and spent a year of service in Japan before being dispatched to South Korea at the onset of the Korean War in 1950 along with his unit, the 34th Infantry Regiment, 24th Infantry Division. During a patrol, Shadrick was killed by the machine gun of a North Korean T-34 tank, and his body was taken to an outpost where journalist Marguerite Higgins was covering the war. Higgins later reported that he was the first soldier killed in the war, a claim that was repeated in media across the United States. His life was widely profiled, and his funeral drew hundreds of people.

His death is now believed to have occurred after the first American combat fatalities in the Battle of Osan. Since the exact identities of the other soldiers killed before Shadrick remain unclear, he is still often incorrectly cited as the first U.S. soldier killed in the war.

== Early life and education ==
Shadrick was born on August 4, 1931, in Harlan County, Kentucky. He was the third of 10 children born to Lucille Shadrick and Theodore Shadrick, a coal miner. Growing up during the Great Depression, Kenneth Shadrick moved with his family to Wyoming, West Virginia, then to an outlying town called Skin Fork, 20 miles (32 km) away, as his father was looking for coal mining jobs. Shadrick was described by his family as "an avid reader" throughout his childhood, who had a variety of interests, including Westerns and magazines. He also enjoyed riding his bicycle and, occasionally, hunting.

Shadrick enrolled in Pineville High School in 1947 and received top marks in his classes. During his sophomore year in 1948, he developed an interest in football and made the school's team, though he was small for his age. The team could not afford uniforms, and Shadrick's father gave him five dollars to buy one, but it was stolen from his locker in October 1948. The incident upset Shadrick so much he dropped out of school, reportedly refusing to return from that day forward. One month later, he and a friend enlisted in the U.S. Army. Shadrick's father would later refer to the stolen school uniform as the reason Shadrick enlisted in the military, and said he felt it indirectly caused his son's death.

On November 10, 1948, Shadrick left for basic combat training at Fort Knox, Kentucky. As he was 17 years old, Shadrick had to convince his parents to sign papers allowing him to enlist. Shadrick completed this training in February 1949, and sailed for Japan to join the 34th Infantry Regiment, 24th Infantry Division, for post–World War II occupation duties. Shadrick spent a year on Kyushu island with the division. According to his family, Shadrick enjoyed his tour in Japan at first, but by June 1950 he was growing tired of the country, and indicated in letters he was feeling depressed.

== Career ==
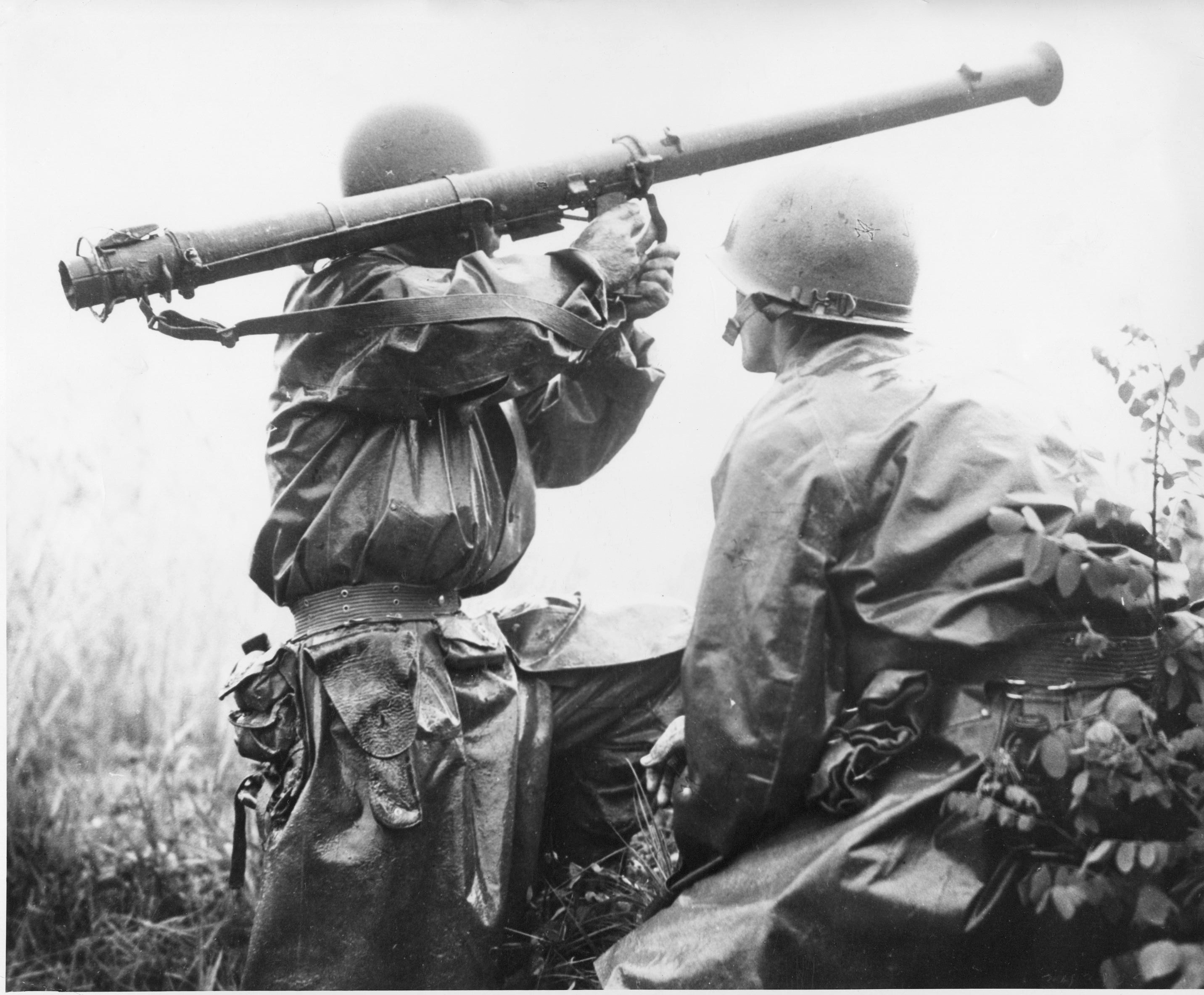
Kenneth R. Shadrick (right) looks on as another soldier, Robert L. Witzig, fires a bazooka at the Battle of Osan. Shadrick was killed by enemy fire a few moments after this photo was made, becoming the first U.S. soldier to die in the Korean campaign.

On the night of June 25, 1950, 10 divisions of the North Korean army launched a full-scale invasion of South Korea. Advancing with 89,000 men in six columns, the North Koreans caught the disorganized, ill-equipped, and unprepared South Korean army by surprise and routed them. North Korean forces destroyed isolated resistance, pushing steadily down the peninsula against the opposing 38,000 front-line South Korean men. The majority of the South Korean forces retreated in the face of the invasion, and by June 28 the North Koreans had captured the southern capital, Seoul, and forced the government and its shattered forces to withdraw southward.

Meanwhile, the United Nations Security Council voted to send assistance to the collapsing country and U.S. President Harry S. Truman ordered ground troops to the country. U.S. forces in the Far East had been steadily decreasing since the end of World War II, five years earlier, and Shadrick's division was the closest to the warzone. Under the command of Major General William F. Dean, the division was understrength and most of its equipment was antiquated due to reductions in military spending. In spite of these deficiencies the division was ordered into South Korea, tasked with taking the initial shock of the North Korean advances until the rest of the Eighth United States Army could arrive and establish a defense.

Dean's plan was to airlift one battalion of the 24th Infantry Division into South Korea via C-54 Skymaster transport aircraft and to block advancing North Korean forces while the remainder of the division was transported on ships. The 21st Infantry Regiment was identified as the most combat-ready of the 24th Infantry Division's three regiments, and the 21st Infantry's 1st Battalion was selected because its commander, Lieutenant Colonel Charles Bradford Smith, was the most experienced, having commanded a battalion at the Battle of Guadalcanal during World War II. On July 5, Task Force Smith engaged North Korean forces at the Battle of Osan, delaying 5,000 North Korean infantry for seven hours before being defeated. The 540-man force suffered 163 casualties: 60 killed, 21 wounded and 82 captured, a very heavy casualty rate. In the chaos of the retreat, most of the bodies were left behind, and the fates of many of the missing were unknown for several weeks.

During that time, the 34th Infantry Regiment set up a line between the villages of Pyongtaek and Ansong, 10 miles (16 km) south of Osan, to fight the next delaying action against the advancing North Korean forces. The 34th Infantry Regiment was similarly unprepared for a fight, with few soldiers experienced in combat. At this time, Shadrick was part of an M9A1 Bazooka team with 1st Battalion, 34th Infantry.

== Death ==
About 90 minutes after Task Force Smith began its withdrawal from the Battle of Osan, the 34th Infantry sent Shadrick as part of a small scouting force northward to the village of Sojong-ni, 5 miles (8.0 km) south of Osan. The small force, under the command of Lieutenant Charles E. Payne and consisting mostly of bazooka teams and infantry, halted at a graveyard in the village, where they spotted a North Korean T-34/85 tank on a road to the north. Shadrick and the other bazooka operators began firing on the tank from long-range concealed positions at around 16:00. With them was Sergeant Charles R. Turnbull, a US Army combat photographer. Turnbull asked Shadrick to time a bazooka shot so its flash could be caught in Turnbull's photograph, and Shadrick complied. Shadrick made the shot and paused, then rose from his concealed position to see if he had successfully hit the tank, exposing himself. The T-34 returned fire with its machine gun, and two bullets struck Shadrick in the chest and arm. Shadrick died of wounds moments later.

Payne's patrol retreated without destroying the tank, taking Shadrick's body with them as the only casualty. The force returned to the 34th Infantry Command post in Pyongtaek to report to Brigadier General George B. Barth and Colonel Harold B. Ayres, who were commanding the troops in the town. Also present was Marguerite Higgins, a war correspondent for the New York Herald Tribune. Higgins subsequently reported Shadrick's death, referring to him as the first American killed in the Korean War.

Shadrick's family was informed of his death by a neighbor who had heard his name on a radio broadcast, and the news from the military came via telegraph several days later. The family was immediately inundated by reporters and local well-wishers. Shadrick's body was returned to the United States, and on June 17, 1951, a funeral attended by hundreds of local residents was held in Beckley, West Virginia. The service was set to coincide with the anniversary of the start of the war. His flag-draped casket was escorted down the streets of the town on a horse-drawn carriage, and he was buried at the American Legion cemetery in the town.

== Legacy ==
Higgins' account of Shadrick's death was widely republished. Time magazine published a story about Shadrick's death on July 17, 1950, citing Shadrick as the first "reported" death in Korea. Life magazine reported Shadrick for up to a year as the first US soldier to die in the war, and the claim has often been repeated, including as recently as July 4, 2011, in the local newspaper in Huntington, West Virginia, The Herald-Dispatch.

American Legion Post 133 erected a monument to Shadrick at the Wyoming County courthouse. The monument cites Shadrick's unit, date of death, and notes him as the "first casualty of the Korean conflict" with an epitaph that reads, "He stands first in the unbroken line of patriots who have dared to die that freedom might live, grow and increase its blessings. Freedom lives and through it he lives – in a way that humbles the undertakings of most men." It is one of several memorials to local residents who served in the military.

Subsequent publications have shed doubt on the accuracy of the claims of Shadrick's distinction. Eyewitness accounts at the Battle of Osan point to the first death as a machine gunner in the 21st Infantry Regiment, who had been killed at around 08:30, eight hours before Shadrick's death. This soldier was killed when a different T-34 tank was disabled at the battle and one of its crew members attacked nearby troops with a PPSh-41 "Burp Gun". In the confusion of the battle, many of the wounded and dead troops were left behind by retreating American troops, and a large part of the force was also captured; consequently, the identity of this first combat fatality remains a mystery.

== Awards and decorations ==
Shadrick's awards and decorations include:

Combat Infantryman Badge
Purple Heart Medal
National Defense Service Medal	Korean Service Medal	United Nations Service Medal for Korea	Korean War Service Medal
Republic of Korea Presidential Unit Citation
24th Infantry Division SSI-FWTS

== Citations ==
=== Sources ===
- Alexander, Bevin (2003), Korea: The First War We Lost, New York City: Hippocrene Books, ISBN 978-0-7818-1019-7
- Appleman, Roy E. (1998), South to the Naktong, North to the Yalu: United States Army in the Korean War, Washington, D.C.: Department of the Army, ISBN 978-0-16-001918-0, archived from the original on 2014-02-07
- Catchpole, Brian (2001), The Korean War, London, United Kingdom: Robinson Publishing, ISBN 978-1-84119-413-4
- Fehrenbach, T.R. (2001), This Kind of War: The Classic Korean War History – Fiftieth Anniversary Edition, Washington D.C.: Potomac Books, ISBN 978-1-57488-334-3
- Harrity, Ralph Derr (2005), Q Clan: The First Summer of the Korean Conflict, June–September 1950, A Lieutenant's Memoir, Pittsburgh: Dorrance Publishing Co., ISBN 978-0-8059-6748-7
- Robinson, Ed (2005), Images of America: Wyoming County, Mount Pleasant, South Carolina: Arcadia Publishing, ISBN 978-0-7385-4173-0
- Varhola, Michael J. (2000), Fire and Ice: The Korean War, 1950–1953, Mason City, Iowa: Da Capo Press, ISBN 978-1-882810-44-4
