= John H. Church =

United States Army general (1892–1953)

John Huston Church
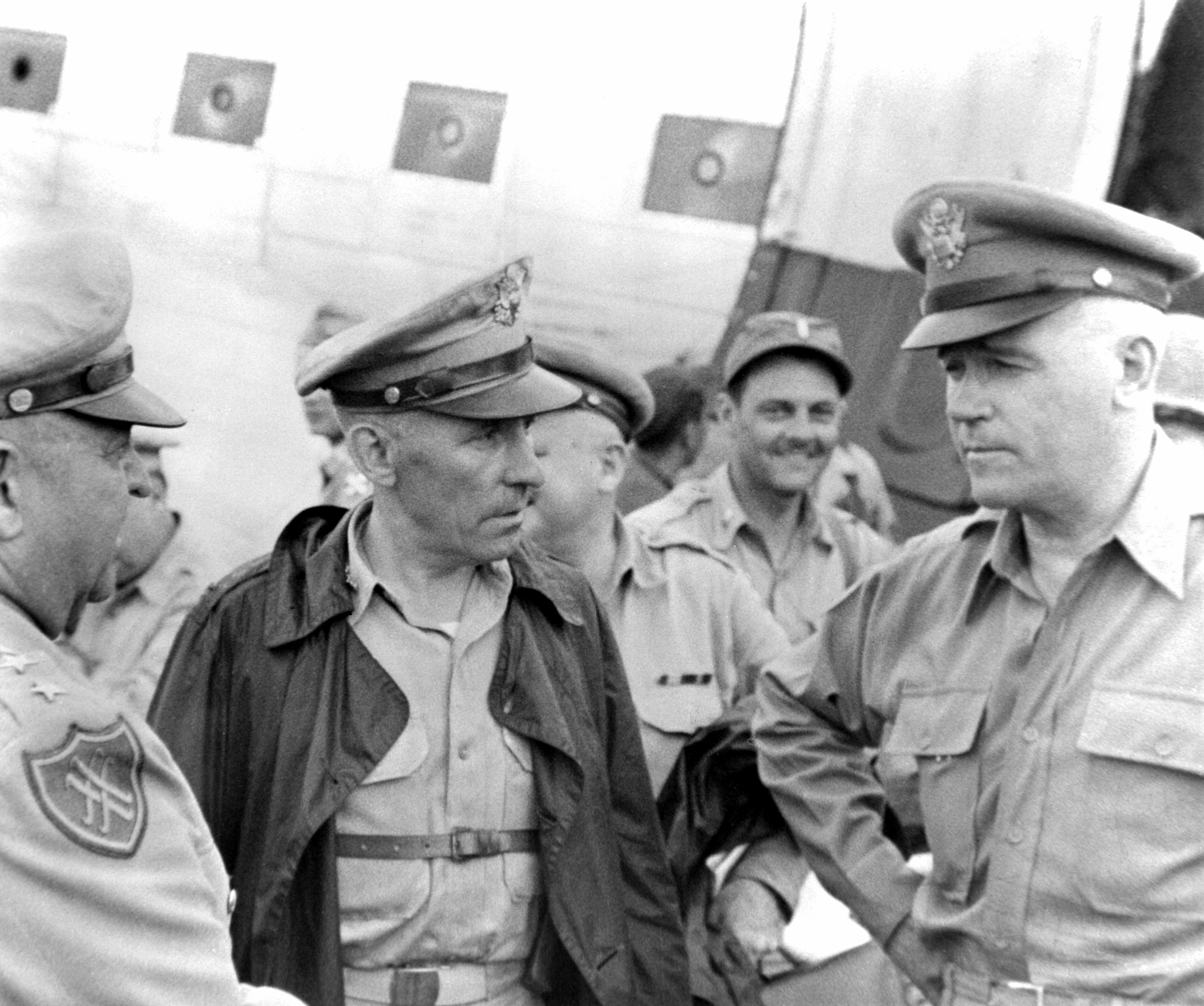
- Major General John H. Church (center in leather jacket) with Lieutenant General Walton Walker and General J. Lawton Collins in Korea.
- Born: June 28, 1892; Glen Iron, Pennsylvania, United States
- Died: November 3, 1953 (aged 61); Washington, D.C., United States
- Burial place: Arlington National Cemetery, Virginia, United States
- Military career
- Allegiance: United States
- Branch: United States Army
- Service years: 1917–1952
- Rank: Major General
- Service number: 0-8197
- Unit: Infantry Branch
- Commands: 157th Infantry Regiment; 5th Infantry Division; 24th Infantry Division; United States Army Infantry School
- Conflicts: World War I World War II; Korean War
- Awards: Distinguished Service Cross; Army Distinguished Service Medal; Silver Star

Major General John Huston Church (June 28, 1892 – November 3, 1953) was a senior officer in the United States Army. He fought in World War I, World War II and in the Korean War. During the latter conflict, he provided assistance to the South Korean Army in the opening days of the war. He later commanded the 24th Infantry Division while it was engaged in the Battle of the Pusan Perimeter.

== Early life ==
John Huston Church was born in the town of Glen Iron in Pennsylvania, on June 28, 1892. From 1915 until 1917, he was a student at New York University. After the American entry into World War I, Church volunteered for the United States Army and was commissioned as a second lieutenant. He served on the Western Front with the 28th Infantry Regiment, part of the 1st Division of the American Expeditionary Force (AEF). He was wounded twice, and was awarded both the Distinguished Service Cross and the Silver Star for heroism in action at the Battle of Cantigny in May 1918. The citation for his DSC reads:

The President of the United States of America, authorized by Act of Congress, July 9, 1918, takes pleasure in presenting the Distinguished Service Cross to Second Lieutenant (Infantry) John Huston Church, United States Army, for extraordinary heroism in action while serving with 28th Infantry Regiment, 1st Division, A.E.F., at Cantigny, France, May 28–31, 1918. Knocked down and rendered unconscious by the explosion of a shell early in the attack, Second Lieutenant Church staggered forward as soon as he regained consciousness and insisted upon resuming command, thereby giving a striking example of fortitude to his men.

The Silver Star citation reads:

The President of the United States of America, authorized by Act of Congress July 9, 1918, takes pleasure in presenting the Silver Star to Second Lieutenant (Infantry) John Huston Church, United States Army, for gallantry in action while serving with the 28th Infantry, 1st Division, American Expeditionary Forces, in action during the operations connected with the capture and defense of Cantigny, France, 27 to 31 May 1918. Second Lieutenant Church although wounded and knocked unconscious by a shell, went forward and resumed command of his platoon and remained with his men until ordered to the rear.

At the end of the war, Church decided to continue with his service in the army. He was aide-de-camp to Brigadier General F. C. Marshall in 1920 and, having been promoted to captain, a post as an instructor with the National Guard in Maryland followed. From 1933 to 1936, he served in the Philippines. In 1936, and by now a major, he returned to the United States to attend the Command and General Staff School for two years. He later served with the Arizona National Guard as an instructor. In October 1940, he became the assistant chief of staff for operations of the 45th Infantry Division.

== World War II ==
After the United States entered World War II in December 1941, Church was appointed chief of staff of the 45th Infantry Division. He served with the division until late 1943, rising to assistant division commander (ADC), during which time it was involved in the Allied invasion of Sicily, numerous battles in the Italian campaign, and Operation Dragoon, the Allied invasion of southern France. At one stage, Church held a regimental command, when from late 1943 to mid-1944, he led the 157th Infantry Regiment.

In September 1944, Church was promoted to the one-star general officer rank of brigadier general and posted to the 84th Infantry Division as its ADC. Church was wounded again as his division took part in the advance from the Netherlands to the Elbe River towards the end of the war. When the division linked up with Soviet Red Army units in May 1945, Church was awarded the Order of the Patriotic War First Class.

== Postwar ==
A year after the war ended, Church became the commander of the Infantry Replacement Training Center at Fort McClellan, Alabama. He was given the same post at Fort Jackson, South Carolina, where he later took command of the 5th Infantry Division. From 1948 until 1949 Church served as the deputy chief of Army Field Forces at Fort Monroe, Virginia. In 1950, he was serving in General Douglas MacArthur's headquarters in Tokyo as a section chief.

== Korean War ==
When the communist North Korean Army invaded South Korea on June 25, 1950, MacArthur sent Church to lead a survey team of staff officers to work with John Muccio, the U.S. ambassador to South Korea, and the Korean Military Advisory Group (KMAG) to assess what assistance could be provided to the South Korean Army. This task resulted in the establishment of GHQ Advance Command and Liaison Group (ADCOM) at Suwon. Arriving in South Korea on June 27, in his role as commander of ADCOM, Church worked with the Chief of Staff of the South Korean Army, General Chae Byong-duk, to improve the South Korean defensive arrangements. Despite his efforts, Seoul was captured by the North Koreans on 28 June and Church recommended the deployment of at least two combat teams of U.S. personnel to help stabilise the situation. This prompted MacArthur to undertake his own survey in Korea the following day and after a further report from Church, he committed U.S. forces to Korea, having received permission from President Harry Truman to do so.

Accordingly, the 24th Infantry Division, which was stationed in Japan as part of the U.S. Eighth Army, was the first army unit sent over from Japan under the command of Major General William F. Dean. A reinforced company of the division, commanded by Lieutenant Colonel Brad Smith, was sent north from Pusan to try to halt the North Koreans. Meeting with Smith at Taejon, Church informed him "All we need is some men up there who won't run when they see tanks", and instructed Smith to make his stand at Osan. Task Force Smith was without tank support and had faulty communications, and was promptly overrun in its first engagement with the North Koreans. Dean gathered his troops in the city of Taejon and formed a strong defense. After a stubborn fight, the American troops retreated. Dean got separated from his troops and was captured. On July 22, Church, without a command following the dissolution of ADCOM, was given command of the division.

His new command, which had less than 10,000 men, was withdrawn to Daegu to rest, but then Lieutenant General Walton Walker, the commander of the U.S. Eighth Army, decided that he needed the 24th to guard the southwest sector, known as the Naktong Bulge, of the Pusan Perimeter. On 6 August, during the subsequent battle, the North Korean 4th Division inflicted more losses on Church's division, breaking through its 34th Infantry Regiment. He had believed initially that the attack was just a probe and only belatedly requested reinforcements from Walker, who had few reserves. Finally, Church, by now promoted to major general, was able to regroup his men and by 18 August had largely destroyed the North Korean division, with the help of a brigade of marines. For his actions during the crossing of the Naktong River the following month, he was awarded another Silver Star:

The President of the United States of America, authorized by Act of Congress July 9, 1918, takes pleasure in presenting a Bronze Oak Leaf Cluster in lieu of a Second Award of the Silver Star to Major General John Huston Church, United States Army, for gallantry in action as Commanding General, 24th Infantry Division, during the Naktong River crossing 19 September 1950. General Church with utter disregard for his own life, went to the Naktong crossing site encouraging his men and reorganizing them to speed the operation. His personal direction immeasurably aided the successful crossing and set an inspiring example to his men, encouraging them to greater effort.

Frail, and suffering from arthritis, Church remained in command of the 24th until January 25, 1951. His health meant that he was not often in the field and Lieutenant General Matthew Ridgway, commander of the U.S. Eighth Army following the death of Walker in December 1950, considered this was detrimental to the state of the division. Ridgway relieved Church of his command and replaced him with Brigadier General Blackshear M. Bryan. Church was awarded the Army Distinguished Service Medal for his leadership of the 24th Division while in Korea. The medal's citation reads:

The President of the United States of America, authorized by Act of Congress July 9, 1918, takes pleasure in presenting the Army Distinguished Service Medal to Major General John Huston Church, United States Army, for exceptionally meritorious and distinguished services to the Government of the United States, in a duty of great responsibility as Commanding General, 24th Infantry Division, in Korea, from 23 July 1950 to 20 January 1951. The singularly distinctive accomplishments of General Church and his dedicated contributions in the service of his country reflect the highest credit upon himself and the United States Army.

== Later life ==
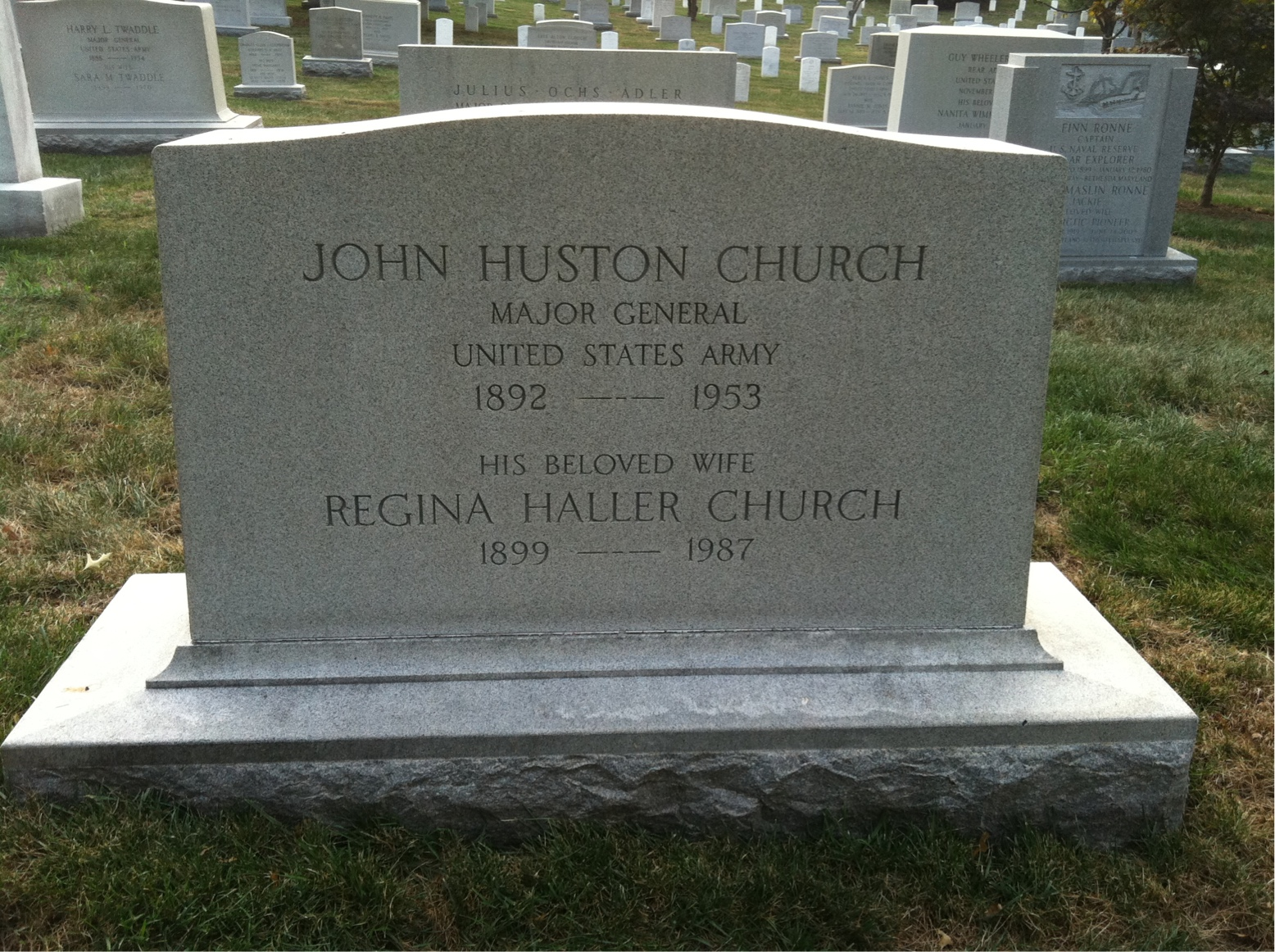
Church's grave at Arlington National Cemetery.

Church subsequently was appointed commandant of the U.S. Army Infantry School at Fort Benning, Georgia and served in that capacity until his retirement from the military in June 1952. He died on 3 November 1953 in Washington, D.C. Survived by his wife, he was buried at Arlington National Cemetery, in Arlington, Virginia.

== Bibliography ==
- Blair, Clay (1987). The Forgotten War: America in Korea, 1950–1953. New York: Times Books. ISBN 0-8129-1670-0.
- Empric, Bruce E. (2024). Uncommon Allies: U.S. Army Recipients of Soviet Military Decorations in World War II. Teufelsberg Press. ISBN 979-83-444-6807-5.
- Halberstam, David (2007). The Coldest Winter: America and the Korean War. New York: Hyperion. ISBN 978-1-4013-0052-4.
- Matray, James I. (1991). Historical Dictionary of the Korean War. New York: Greenwood Press. ISBN 978-0-313-25924-1.
- Taaffe, Stephen R. (2016). MacArthur's Korean War Generals. Lawrence, Kansas: University Press of Kansas. ISBN 978-0-7006-2221-4.
- Weintraub, Stanley (2001). MacArthur's War: Korea and the Undoing of an American Hero. New York: Touchstone. ISBN 0-7432-0503-0.

Military offices
Preceded by Newly activated organization	Commanding General 5th Infantry Division; July–October 1947	Succeeded by William B. Kean
Preceded by William F. Dean	Commanding General 24th Infantry Division; 1950–1951	Succeeded by Blackshear M. Bryan
Preceded by Withers A. Burress	Commandant of the United States Army Infantry School; 1951–1952	Succeeded by Robert Nicholas Young
