= Battle of Pyongtaek =

Battle of the Korean War

Coordinates: 36°59′36″N 127°5′46″E

- Part of the Korean War
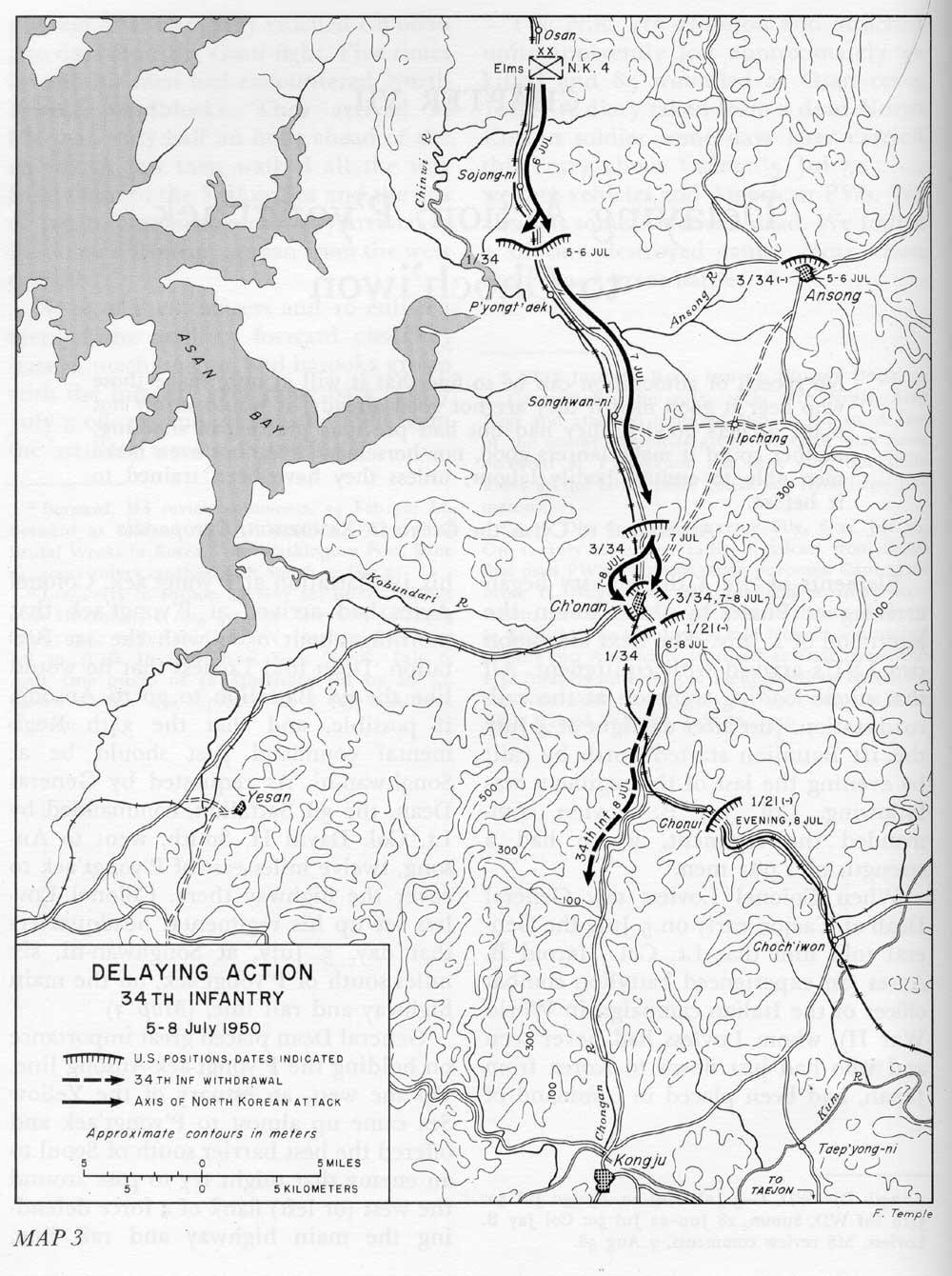
- Map of the 34th Infantry Regiment's delay action from July 5 to 8
Date	July 6, 1950; 76 years ago
Location	Pyongtaek, South Korea
Result	North Korean victory

Belligerents
United Nations: United States	North Korea

Commanders and leaders
George B. Barth; Jay B. Lovless	Lee Kwon Mu

Units involved
34th Infantry Regiment	4th Infantry Division: 16th Infantry Regiment; 18th Infantry Regiment; 105th Armored Division: 107th Tank Regiment

Strength
2,000	12,000

Casualties and losses
33 killed or missing (Note: Several of the captured American servicemen were executed by the North Koreans.) and 18 wounded	Unknown

The Battle of Pyongtaek was the second engagement between United States and North Korean forces during the Korean War, occurring on July 6, 1950, in the village of Pyongtaek in western South Korea. The fight ended in a North Korean victory following unsuccessful attempts by American forces to inflict significant damage or delays on advancing North Korean units, despite several opportunities to do so.

The United States Army's 34th Infantry Regiment, 24th Infantry Division was assigned to delay elements of the North Korean People's Army's 4th Infantry Division as it advanced south following its victory at the Battle of Osan the day before. The regiment emplaced at Pyongtaek and Ansong attempting to form a line to hold the North Koreans in an area where the terrain formed a bottleneck between mountains and the Yellow Sea.

Half of the regiment's strength was ordered to retreat from its position before the North Korean force was encountered, leaving the flank open for the remaining force, 1st Battalion at Pyongtaek. The battalion encountered North Korean forces the morning of July 6, and after a brief fight, was unable to repel them effectively. The battalion then mounted a disorganized retreat to Cheonan several miles away, having failed to significantly delay the North Korean forces in their movement south.

== Background ==
=== Outbreak of war ===
On the night of June 25, 1950, 10 divisions of the North Korean People's Army launched a full-scale invasion on the nation's neighbor to the south, the Republic of Korea. The force of 89,000 men moved in six columns, catching the Republic of Korea Army completely by surprise, resulting in a disastrous rout for the South Koreans, who were disorganized, ill-equipped, and unprepared for war. Numerically superior, North Korean forces destroyed isolated resistance from the 38,000 South Korean soldiers on the front, advancing steadily south. Most of South Korea's forces retreated in the face of the invasion, and by June 28, the North Koreans had captured Seoul, South Korea's capital, forcing the government and its shattered forces to withdraw south.

The United Nations Security Council voted to send assistance to the collapsing country. US President Harry S. Truman subsequently ordered ground troops into the nation. However, US forces in the Far East had been steadily decreasing since the end of World War II five years earlier. At the time, the closest forces were the 24th Infantry Division of the Eighth United States Army, which was headquartered in Japan under the command of Major General William F. Dean. However, the division was under strength, and most of its equipment was antiquated due to reductions in military spending following World War II. In spite of these deficiencies, the 24th Infantry Division was ordered into South Korea.

=== Battle of Osan ===
From the 24th Infantry Division, one battalion was assigned to be airlifted into Korea via C-54 Skymaster transport aircraft and move quickly to block advancing North Korean forces while the remainder of the division could be transported to South Korea on ships. The 21st Infantry Regiment was determined to be the most combat-ready of the 24th Infantry Division's three regiments, and the 21st Infantry's 1st Battalion was selected because its commander, Lieutenant Colonel Charles B. Smith, was the most experienced, having commanded a battalion at the Battle of Guadalcanal during World War II. On July 5, Task Force Smith engaged North Korean forces at the Battle of Osan, delaying over 5,000 North Korean infantry for seven hours before being routed and forced back.

During that time, the 24th Division's 34th Infantry Regiment, with 2,000 men organized into the 1st and 3rd Battalions, was the second US unit into Korea, and was sent by rail north from Pusan. The 1st Battalion, 34th Infantry emplaced at Pyongtaek, 10 miles (16 km) south of Osan, to block the next North Korean advance. Pyongtaek was a village consisting mostly of wooden huts and muddy roads In the meantime, 3rd Battalion, 34th Infantry was emplaced at Anseong, several miles east. The two battalions were assigned to form a line to block any North Korean advance. Terrain south of the Ansong–Pyongtaek line was substantially more open, meaning the line sat on a bottleneck, with mountain ranges to the east and an inlet of the Yellow Sea to the west. Therefore, Dean considered the line vital to his defensive plans.

The 1st Battalion was unprepared for a fight as it was poorly trained and had no tanks or anti-tank guns to fight North Korean armor. Shortages of equipment hampered the entire division's efforts. Shortages in heavy guns reduced artillery support to the entire division. Communications equipment, weapons, and ammunition was largely absent, large amounts of equipment were en route but the division had been under-equipped in Japan. Most of the radios available to the division did not work, and batteries, communication wire, and telephones to communicate among units were in short supply. The division had no tanks: its new M26 Pershing and older M4A3 Sherman tanks had not yet arrived. One of the few weapons that could penetrate the North Korean T-34, high-explosive anti-tank (HEAT) ammunition, was in short supply. The paucity of radios and wire hampered communication between and among the American units.

The battalion's new commander, Lieutenant Colonel Ayres, was apparently given faulty intelligence, and he told his command that the Koreans advancing south were poorly trained and equipped. The battalion formed a line 2 miles (3.2 km) north of Pyongtaek, in a series of grassy hills and rice paddies where it dug in and prepared for advancing North Korean forces. The soldiers of the battalion were equipped with only M1 Garand rifles or other weapons, C-rations, and less than 100 rounds of ammunition each, whilst only one M2 Browning machine gun was available to each platoon. There were no grenades and little to no ammunition for any of the heavier weapons which could be used against North Korean tanks. Additionally, only a few of the soldiers of the regiment had any combat experience from World War II, and they had been hastily transferred from another division the day before.

== Battle ==
=== Opening moves ===
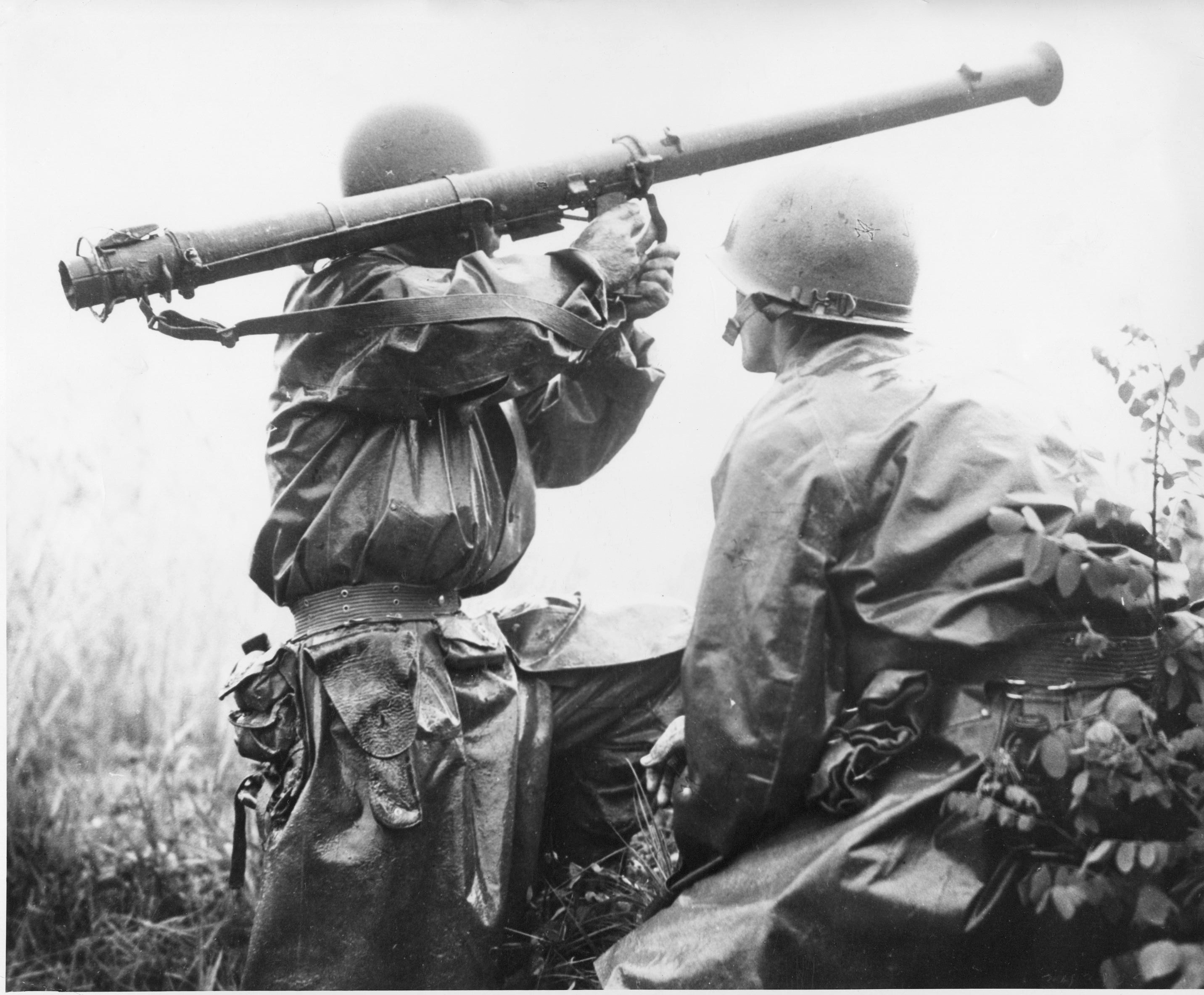
An American soldier (Robert L. Witzig) with a 2.36-inch bazooka prepares to take aim at a North Korean tank during the Battle of Pyongtaek. On his right is Kenneth R. Shadrick, who was killed by North Korean tank-mounted machine gun fire seconds after this photograph was taken. Shadrick would later be reported as the first American killed in the Korean War. {Incorrectly reported as being taken during the Battle of Osan}

A reconnaissance team sent north on the evening of July 5 reported seeing tanks south of Osan. The team attempted to destroy a tank it spotted in the village of Sojong but was unsuccessful; it suffered one killed (Private Kenneth R. Shadrick) and was forced to return to Pyongtaek. Shortly after, several survivors from Task Force Smith arrived at 1st Battalion's command post telling stories of their defeat at Osan, but Ayres did not believe they were accurate. Brigadier General George B. Barth, acting division artillery commander for the 24th Infantry Division, stopped by the command post and ordered that the battalion hold only as long as it could, and not to risk being flanked or surrounded, wary of the defeat at Osan. Barth then moved to the 34th Infantry Regiment's command where he ordered regimental commander Colonel Jay B. Lovless to consolidate the Regiment at Cheonan to the south. Lovless subsequently moved 3rd Battalion south, without having ever engaged the enemy. Barth believed the 34th Infantry would not be able to defend Pyongtaek as long as the 21st Infantry defended Osan. From 3rd Battalion, L Company was detached and ordered to hold south of Pyongtaek to cover the 1st Battalion when it retreated. This order was not carried out, and L Company left for Chonan.

Having pushed back Task Force Smith at Osan, the North Korean 4th Infantry Division, supported by elements of the North Korean 105th Armored Division, continued their advance down the Osan-Pyongtaek road, up to 12,000 men strong under division commander Lee Kwon Mu in two infantry regiments supported by dozens of tanks. Barth, who had been with Task Force Smith as an observer, had ordered the 1st Battalion, 34th Infantry to hold until the North Koreans threatened to envelop them, then to fall back to successive positions south, delaying the North Korean force as long as possible. At midnight on July 5, several more survivors of Task Force Smith streamed into the battalion's lines. At 0300 on July 6, the battalion destroyed a small bridge over a stream 600 yards (550 m) north of its position.

=== North Korean attack ===
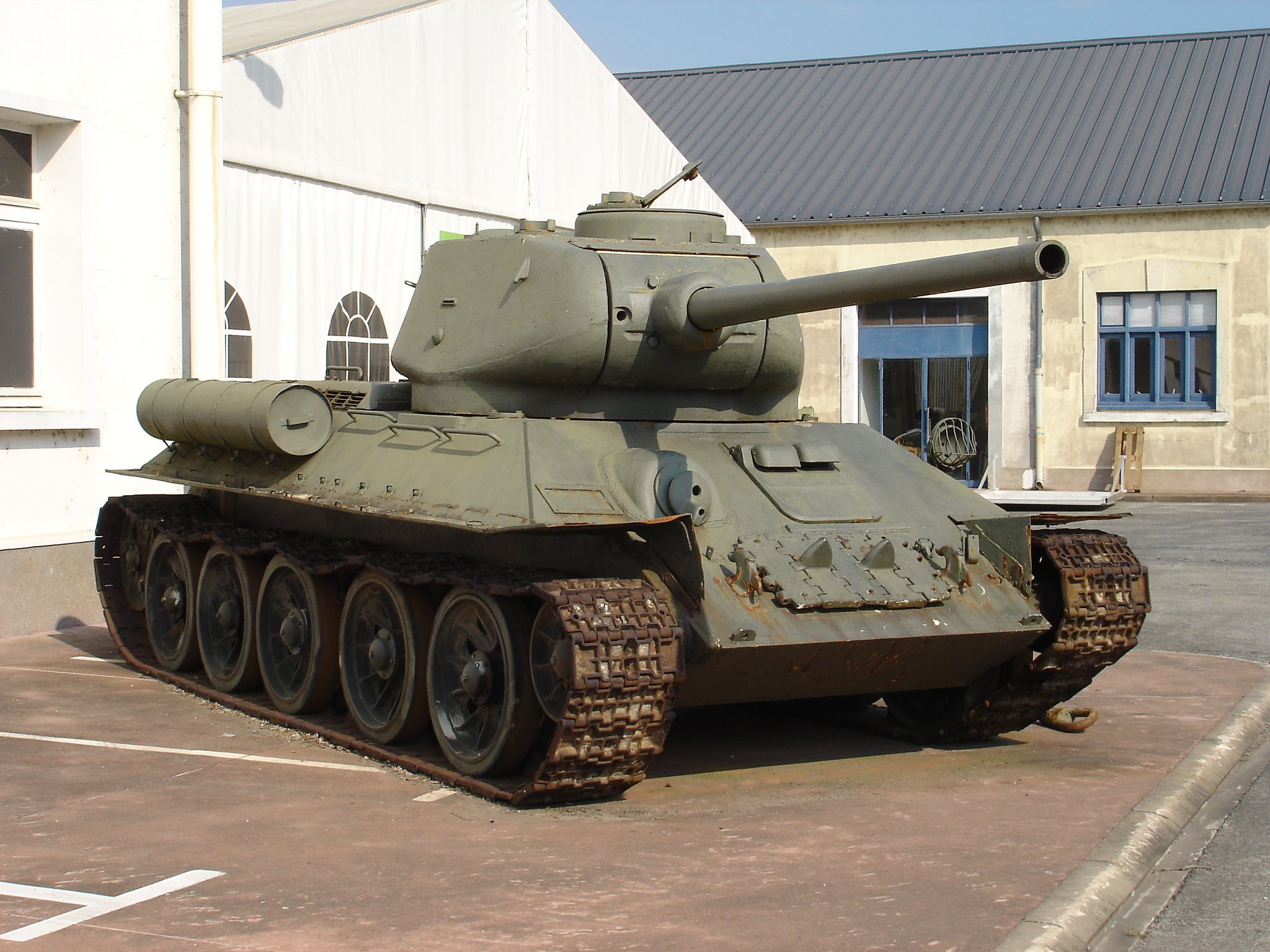
The T-34 tank was widely used by the North Korean Army in 1950. Over a dozen T-34s were observed at Pyongtaek but American forces had no effective weapons to fight them.

Rain and fog were heavy throughout the morning of July 6, and visibility was limited for the emplaced troops. Just after daybreak, 13 North Korean T-34 tanks were spotted stopped at the bridge. Following them were two columns of infantry. The American forces originally believed that they might be survivors of Task Force Smith until they realized the forces were deploying in numbers too great, and began preparing to attack the unsuspecting North Koreans. The battalion's commander ordered mortar fire on the North Korean forces, causing them to disperse as the lead tank began firing on the positions of A Company, on a hill southwest of the road. Mortar fire destroyed a truck, but a round from a North Korean tank stunned the artillery observer and no one took his place in the confusion, ending the American mortar attack. North Korean forces immediately began advancing on A Company's position, but the company was not able to return fire effectively, with fewer than half of its soldiers using their weapons. For several minutes only squad and platoon leaders shot back while the rest of the soldiers hid in their foxholes. Within fifteen minutes, B Company was able to return fire effectively, and by this time the North Korean forces had advanced steadily toward 1st Battalion's position. Later examinations found many American soldiers' weapons were assembled incorrectly or were dirty or broken. The Americans had nothing with which to fight the tanks, and were unable to do anything to stop them.

As North Korean soldiers advanced, they began to envelop both A and B Companies, and 30 minutes after the first shots were fired, both companies were ordered to withdraw, one platoon at a time. C Company, kept in reserve during the engagement, retreated without coming in contact with North Korean forces. A Company, under the heaviest attack, attempted a gradual withdrawal which quickly became disorderly, as men ran from the hill, some without weapons and ammunition, being strafed by North Korean machine guns the entire time. Panic quickly overtook many of the men of the battalion, and they started running past the designated rally points, all the way to Pyongtaek. Others, too scared to retreat, remained in their foxholes and were captured by the North Korean forces. One officer attempted to stay behind and search for survivors, before he and three others were allegedly captured and executed by North Korean forces. Company commanders gathered what men they could and began moving south, though one-fourth of 1st Battalion was killed, missing or captured immediately after the brief fight. The retreating elements left a trail of equipment behind, littering the road back to Pyongtaek with ammunition, helmets, and rain gear. In the disorderly retreat one platoon from A Company was left behind, and had to retreat through a railway for cover.

=== American withdrawal ===
The battalion regrouped at Pyongtaek itself, mostly a mass of disorganized soldiers without leadership. Engineers with the battalion demolished a bridge north of the town before moving south. The remains of A Company then headed for Cheonan, regrouping there with the rest of the 1st and 3rd Battalions which had also withdrawn. Though a few jeeps and trucks were found and commandeered, most of the retreat was carried out on foot. A few scattered artillery shells landed around the retreating force, but North Korean soldiers did not aggressively pursue them. By noon the disorganized remains of the 34th Infantry had outrun all enemy fire and were out of immediate danger.

The soldiers, most of their equipment missing, made no attempt at further delaying actions, and were unable to communicate with other units because their radio equipment had been lost. As they were retreating, an American aircraft accidentally strafed the column, injuring one South Korean soldier moving with them, further demoralizing the soldiers. The 34th Infantry Regiment began to set up a new line south of Chonan by nightfall, even though many of its men no longer had equipment to fight with.

== Aftermath ==
General Dean, the divisional commander, was angered by the poor performance of the 34th Infantry Regiment during the battle. He allegedly was upset that the regiment retreated so quickly without attempting to further delay the North Koreans. He considered ordering the regiment back north immediately but did not do so for fear of ambush. Dean replaced the commander of the 34th Infantry, Colonel Lovless, and ordered the 3rd Battalion back north, but when it encountered North Korean resistance it immediately became disorganized and was forced to withdraw. The engagement at Pyongtaek had caused a significant decline in morale among American forces fighting on the peninsula, and this would continue until victories at Inchon and the Pusan Perimeter allowed them to go on the offensive. Dean took the blame for the defeat himself, and historians consider him at least partially at fault for expecting one inexperienced battalion to hold the line against a numerically superior enemy who was well-trained.

The regiment was forced to regroup at Cheonan and oppose the North Korean forces again, and it suffered heavy casualties before being forced to withdraw after the Battle of Cheonan. The 24th Infantry Division would continue to fight in delaying actions such as this one for two more weeks until it was overwhelmed at the Battle of Taejon, however by that time the Pusan Perimeter would be in place, and other US divisions would be able to hold the line for several more months during the Battle of Pusan Perimeter until the Inchon Landings, when American forces would finally defeat the North Korean Army, ending the first phase of the war.
