= Battle of Osan =

First US–North Korea battle in Korean War

- Part of the Korean War
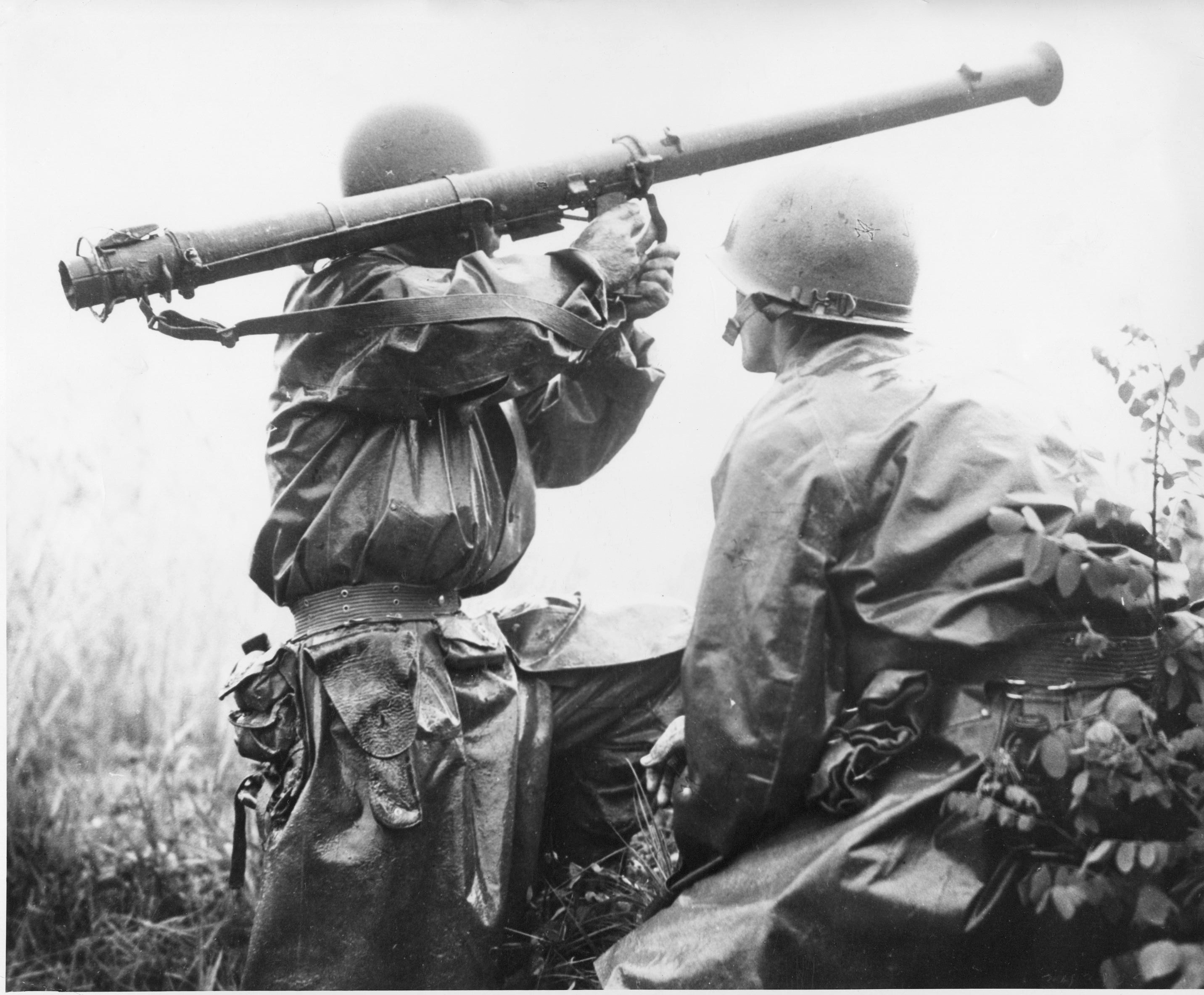
- A US soldier, Robert L. Witzig, with a 2.36-inch bazooka prepares to take aim at a North Korean tank during the Battle of Pyongtaek which took place after the Battle of Osan. On his right is Kenneth R. Shadrick, who was later reported as the first American killed in the Korean War.
Date	July 5, 1950
Location	Osan, South Korea 37°11′6″N 127°3′9″E
Result	North Korean victory

Belligerents
United Nations; United States	North Korea

Commanders and leaders
Charles Bradford Smith; Miller O. Perry	Lee Kwon-mu; Ryu Kyong-su

Units involved
United States Army; 1st Battalion, 21st Infantry; Battery A 52nd Field Artillery Battalion	Korean People's Army Ground Force; 4th Infantry Division; 16th Infantry Regiment; 18th Infantry Regiment; 105th Armored Division; 107th Tank Regiment

Strength
540 infantry and support	5,000 infantry 36 tanks

Casualties and losses
54 killedor 60 killed 27 wounded 83 captured (Note: Several of the captured American servicemen were executed by the North Koreans.); 1 howitzer destroyed 5 howitzers disabled	42 killed 85 wounded 1 tank destroyed 3 tanks disabled
- Location within Korea

The Battle of Osan (Korean: 오산 전투) was the first engagement between the United States and North Korea during the Korean War. On July 5, 1950, Task Force Smith, an American task force of 540 infantry supported by an artillery battery, was moved to Osan, south of Seoul, the capital of South Korea, and was ordered to fight as a rearguard to delay the advancing North Korean forces while more US troops arrived to form a stronger defensive line to the south. The task force lacked both anti-tank guns and effective infantry anti-tank weapons and had been equipped with obsolete (60 mm) rocket launchers and a few 57 mm recoilless rifles. Aside from a limited number of HEAT shells for the unit's 105 mm howitzers, crew-served weapons that could defeat T-34/85 tanks from the Soviet Union had not yet been distributed to the US Army forces in South Korea.

A North Korean tank column equipped with ex-Soviet T-34/85 tanks overran the task force in the first encounter and continued its advance south. After the North Korean tank column had breached US lines, the task force opened fire on a force of some 5,000 North Korean infantry that were approaching its position, which held up their advance. North Korean troops eventually flanked and overwhelmed the US positions, and the rest of the task force retreated in disorder.

== Outbreak of war ==
During the night of June 25, 1950, ten divisions of the North Korean People's Army launched a full-scale invasion of its southern neighbor, the Republic of Korea. The North Korean force of 89,000 men moved in six columns, caught the Republic of Korea Armed Forces by surprise, and routed them. The smaller South Korean Army suffered from widespread lack of organization and equipment and was unprepared for war. The numerically-superior North Korean forces destroyed isolated resistance from the 38,000 South Korean soldiers on the front before they began moving steadily to the south. Most South Korean forces retreated in the face of the invasion. The North Koreans had captured South Korea's capital, Seoul, by June 28, which forced the government and its shattered army to retreat further south.

To prevent South Korea's collapse, the UN Security Council voted to send military forces. The US Seventh Fleet dispatched Task Force 77, led by the USS Valley Forge, the fleet carrier; the British Far East Fleet dispatched several ships, including HMS Triumph, to provide air and naval support. Although the navies blockaded North Korea and launched aircraft to delay the North Korean forces, those efforts alone did not stop the North Korean Army juggernaut on its southern advance. US President Harry S. Truman ordered ground troops into the country to supplement the air support. The strength of US forces in the Far East, however, had steadily declined since the end of World War II, five years earlier, and the closest unit was the 24th Infantry Division of the Eighth United States Army, headquartered in Japan. Military spending cuts meant that the division was understrength and using outdated equipment.

Division Commander Major General William F. Dean determined that the 21st Infantry Regiment was the most combat-ready of the 24th Infantry Division's three regiments. He decided to send the 1st Battalion from the formation because its commander, Lieutenant Colonel Charles Bradford Smith, was the most experienced leading man since he had fought at the Battle of Guadalcanal during World War II. C-54 Skymaster transport aircraft airlifted one battalion from the division garrison under Smith's command into Korea. The battalion deployed quickly to block advancing North Korean forces and performed a holding action while the rest of the division could be moved to South Korea by sea.

== Task Force Smith ==
When you get to Pusan, head for Taejon. We want to stop the North Koreans as far from Pusan as we can. Block the main road as far north as possible. Make contact with General Church. If you can't find him, go to Taejon and beyond if you can. Sorry I can't give you more information—that's all I've got. Good luck, and God bless you and your men!

— Major General William F. Dean's orders to Colonel Smith

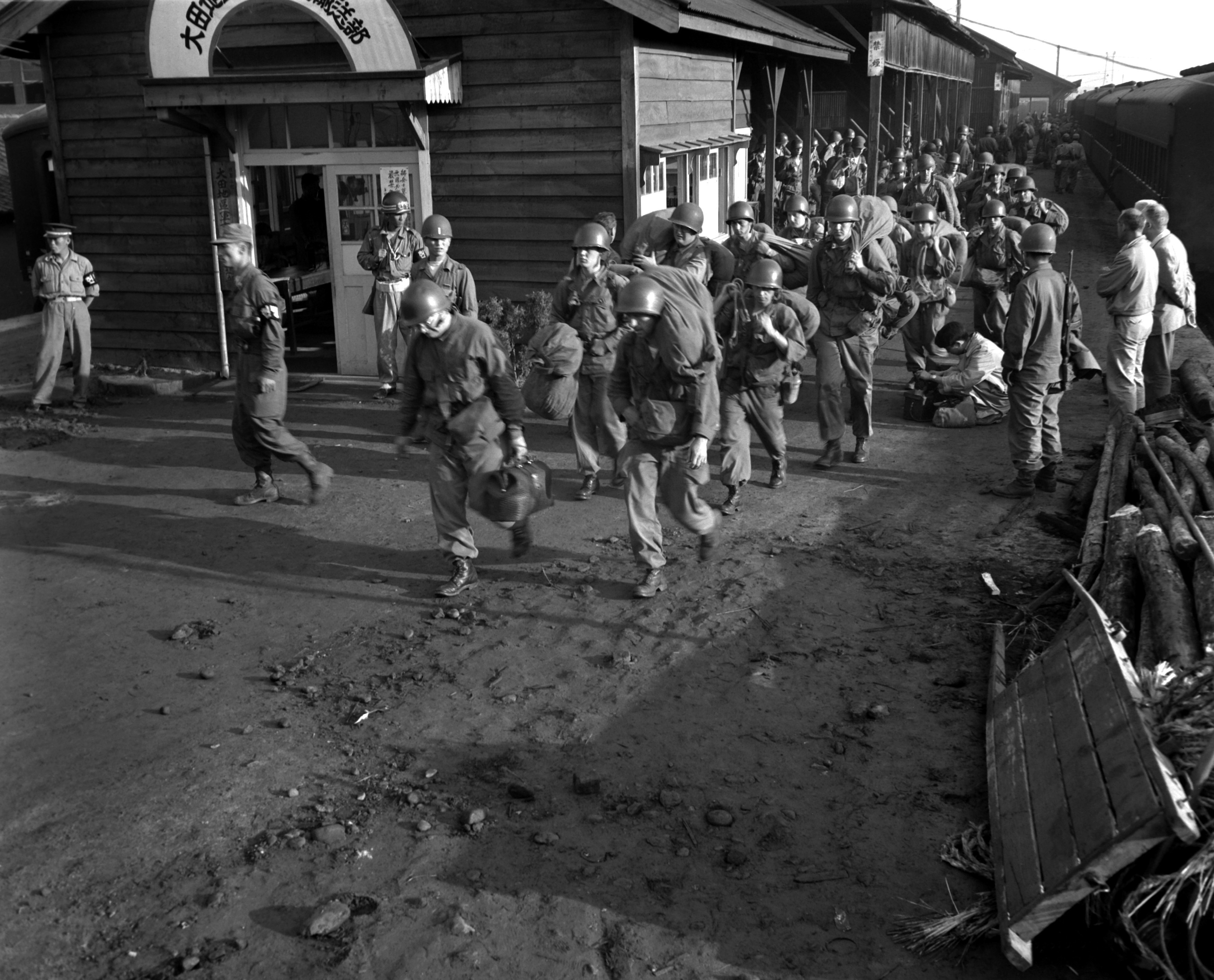
Task Force Smith arrives in South Korea

The first units of the 24th Infantry Division left Itazuke Air Base in Japan on June 30. Task Force Smith, named after its commander Charles Bradford Smith, had 406 men of the 1st Battalion, 21st Infantry Regiment, and 134 men of A Battery, 52nd Field Artillery Battalion, under the command of Lieutenant-Colonel Miller O. Perry. The forces were both poorly equipped and understrength: 1st Battalion, 21st Infantry, had only two companies of infantry (B and C companies), instead of the normal three for a US Army battalion. The battalion had half of the required number of troops in its headquarters company, half of a communications platoon, and half of a heavy weapons platoon, which was armed with six obsolescent M9A1 Bazooka rocket launchers, two 75 mm recoilless rifles, two 4.2 inch mortars, and four 60 mm mortars. Much of the equipment was drawn from the rest of the understrength 21st. A Battery, which formed the entire artillery support for the task force, was armed with six 105 mm howitzers. The howitzers were equipped with 1,200 high explosive (HE) rounds but were incapable of penetrating tank armor. Only six high explosive anti-tank (HEAT) rounds were issued to the battery, all of which were allocated to the number six howitzer sited forward of the main battery emplacement. A Battery also had four .50 calibre M2 Browning heavy machine guns and four bazookas.

Most of the soldiers of the task force were teenagers with no combat experience and only eight weeks of basic training. Only a third of the officers in the task force had combat experience from World War II, and only one in six enlisted soldiers had combat experience. Many of them still volunteered to join the task force. The soldiers were each equipped with only 120 rounds of ammunition and two days of C-rations.

Task Force Smith order of battle

- 1st Battalion, 21st Infantry
  - Headquarters Platoon
  - B Company
  - C Company
  - Heavy Weapons Platoon
- 52nd Field Artillery Battalion
  - A Battery

By July 1, Task Force Smith had fully arrived in South Korea and briefly established a headquarters in Taejon. The task force soon after began moving north by rail and truck to oppose the North Korean Army. Task Force Smith was the first of several small US units sent into Korea with the mission to take the initial "shock" of North Korean advances and to delay much larger North Korean units with the goal of buying time to allow more U.S. units into Korea. Task Force Smith's mission was to move as far north as possible and to begin engaging the North Koreans to stem their advance so that the rest of the 24th Infantry Division could be moved into South Korea to reinforce it. The 24th Division commander, William F. Dean, personally ordered Smith to stop the North Korean force along the highway from Suwon and "as far from Pusan" as possible.

Three days later, on July 4, it dug in on two hills straddling the road north of the village of Osan, 6 miles (10 km) south of Suwon and about 25 miles (40 km) south of Seoul. The ridges rose to 300 ft (100 m) above the road, which provided visibility almost the entire distance to Suwon. The battalion set up a 1 mi (1.6 km) line over the ridges. There, they waited to meet the advancing North Korean forces. The force was placed along the road with the infantry formations on the two hills, five of the howitzers 1 mi (1.6 km) behind the infantry, and the sixth with its six HEAT shells positioned halfway between the infantry and the other five field artillery pieces. Heavy rain made air support impossible and so Smith and Perry preregistered the artillery battery in the hope it would be just as effective. The heavy machine guns and bazookas of A Battery along with a volunteer crew were sent forward to reinforce the infantry.

== Battle ==
=== Tank columns ===
At around 0730 on July 5, Task Force Smith spotted a column of eight North Korean T-34/85 tanks of the 107th Tank Regiment, North Korean 105th Armored Division heading south toward them. The North Korean forces, driving south from Seoul, pursued retreating South Korean forces. At 08:16, the artillery battery fired its first rounds at the advancing North Korean tanks. The tanks, which were around 2 km (1.2 mi) from the infantry force, were hit with numerous 105 mm howitzer rounds, but they were unaffected. When the tanks closed to 700 m (2,300 ft), the 75 mm recoilless rifles fired and scored direct hits on the lead tanks but did not damage them. The North Korean tanks returned fire but could not locate the American positions and gun emplacements, and their fire was ineffective.

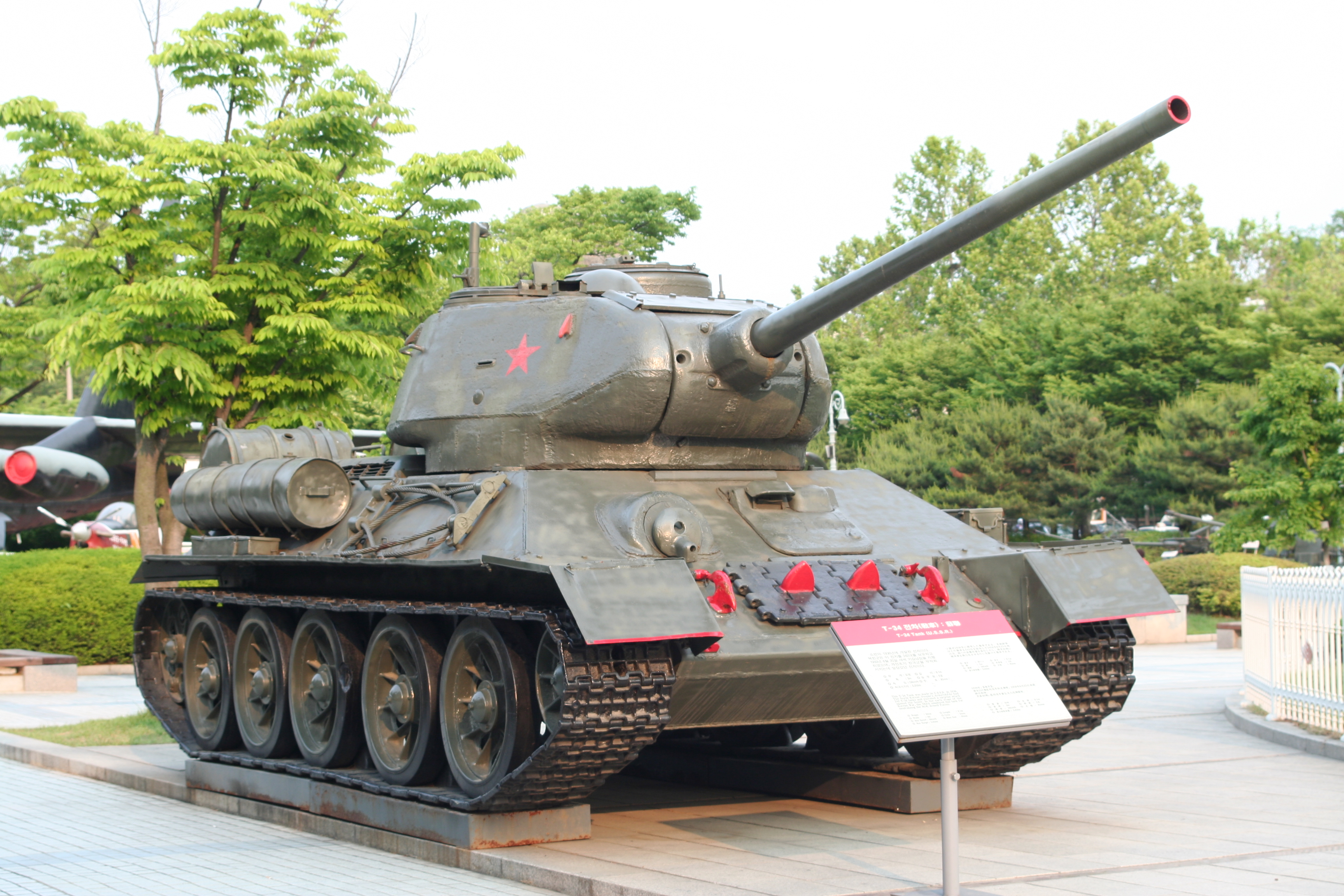
The T-34 tank was standard armor by the North Korean Army in 1950 and was used at Osan.

Once the tanks reached the infantry line Second Lieutenant Ollie Connor fired 22 60 mm (2.36-inch) rockets at a range of 15 yd (14 m) from his M9A1 launcher tube. Only some of these ignited, but several struck the rear plate armor of several T-34s where their armor was thinnest. The warheads failed to penetrate the armor, however, and the North Korean tanks continued their advance, ignored the roadblock, and continued down the road. The operators assumed that the roadblock was manned by South Korean troops and ignored it since it did not pose a serious threat. When the tank column came over the crest of the road, the forward howitzer, commanded by Corporal Herman V. Critchfield, the chief of section, and crewed by five cannoneers, fired its HEAT rounds, damaged the first two tanks, and set one of them on fire. One of the crew members of the burning tank emerged with a PPSh-41 and killed a member of an American machine gun crew before he was killed himself; the American became the first casualty of Korean War ground combat. He was later identified, incorrectly, as Kenneth R. Shadrick. The howitzer, depleted of HEAT rounds, began firing high explosive rounds before it was destroyed by the third T-34. The tanks then advanced and continued to ignore the American howitzer and bazooka fire. The US forces managed to disable another North Korean T-34 when a 105 mm shell struck and damaged its tracks. The tracks of the T-34 tanks cut the communication signal wires between the American infantry and artillery forces, which further compounded the confusion. Perry was wounded in the leg by North Korean small arms fire as he attempted to get the crew of the disabled tank to surrender. His artillery force continued firing at the North Korean tanks without effect.

The second column of 25 T-34 tanks approached the task force within an hour. The new T-34 formation advanced singly or by twos and threes close together with no apparent formal organization. The howitzer battery hit another tank from the column in its tracks, disabled it, and damaged three more. The North Korean tanks had destroyed the forward howitzer (number six) and wounded one of its crew members, killed or wounded an estimated 20 infantrymen, and destroyed all of the parked vehicles behind the infantry line. At the main battery position, one of the five remaining 105 mm guns had been slightly damaged by a near-hit. Several of the men in the artillery battery began deserting their positions, but Perry managed to convince most of them to return. Although Smith later stated that he believed that the rounds had deteriorated with age, the ineffectiveness of the 2.36-inch bazooka had been demonstrated repeatedly during World War II against German armor. Because of peacetime defense cutbacks, the 24th Infantry Division had never received improved M20 3.5-inch "Super Bazookas" with M28A2 HEAT antitank ammunition, which could defeat Soviet tanks. After the last tanks had passed their lines, no North Korean forces were spotted for around an hour.

=== Infantry column ===
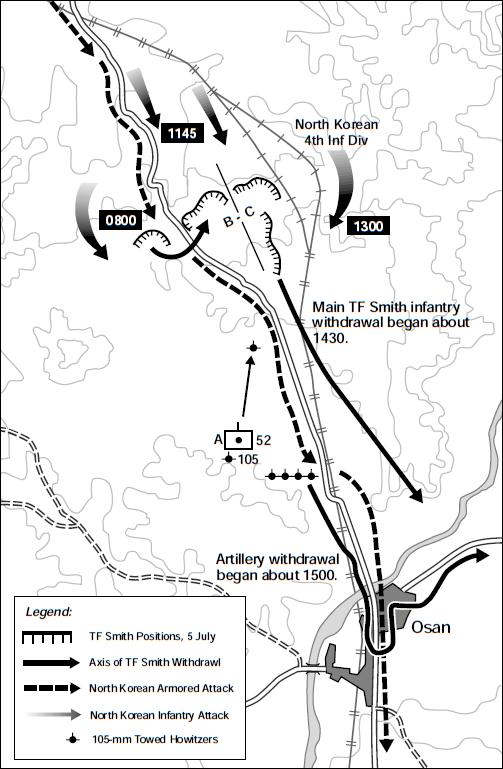
Map of the battle

Three more tanks were sighted advancing from the north at around 11:00. Behind them were a column of trucks 6 miles (9.7 km) long, carrying two full infantry regiments; the 16th Infantry Regiment; and the 18th Infantry Regiment of the North Korean 4th Infantry Division, which amounted to almost 5,000 troops under the command of Major General Lee Kwon Mu, which were advancing from Seoul. The column apparently was not in communication with the tanks that had preceded it, and the North Korean infantry was not aware of the Americans' presence.

At 11:45, when the column had advanced to within 1,000 yd (1,000 m) of the Americans, Smith gave the order for the task force to open fire with everything that it had. The mortar, machine gun, artillery, and rifle fire destroyed several trucks, which scattered the column. The three lead tanks moved to within 300 m (1,000 ft) of Task Force Smith and opened fire. Behind them, around 1,000 of the infantry formed in the rice paddies to the east of the road in an attempt to flank the American forces, but they were repulsed. Smith attempted to order artillery fire on the North Korean force, but runners were unable to get back to the field artillery positions and so he assumed they had been destroyed by the tanks. Within 45 minutes, another enveloping force formed to the west of the road, which forced Smith to withdraw a platoon to the east side of the road. The US infantry then began to take mortar and artillery fire from the North Koreans.

=== American withdrawal ===
Task Force Smith managed to hold its lines for three hours, but at 14:30, Smith ordered the Americans to withdraw since they suffered from low ammunition and a breakdown of communications. North Korean forces were then moving on both flanks of the American force and toward the rear of the formation. Smith ordered an orderly withdrawal of the force one unit at a time to allow the rest of the force to cover it as it withdrew. C Company pulled back, followed by the American medics, the headquarters, and finally B Company. 2nd Platoon, B Company, however, did not receive the withdrawal order. When the platoon discovered that it was alone, it was too late for an orderly withdrawal, and the platoon could not move its wounded quickly enough. The platoon left most of its equipment in its positions, which was captured by the North Koreans. Most of the survivors escaped captivity, but a number of wounded litter-borne US soldiers were left behind along with an attending medic. The American wounded were later found shot to death in their litters; the medic was never seen again. One North Korean officer later told the historian John Toland that the American forces at the battle seemed "too frightened to fight."

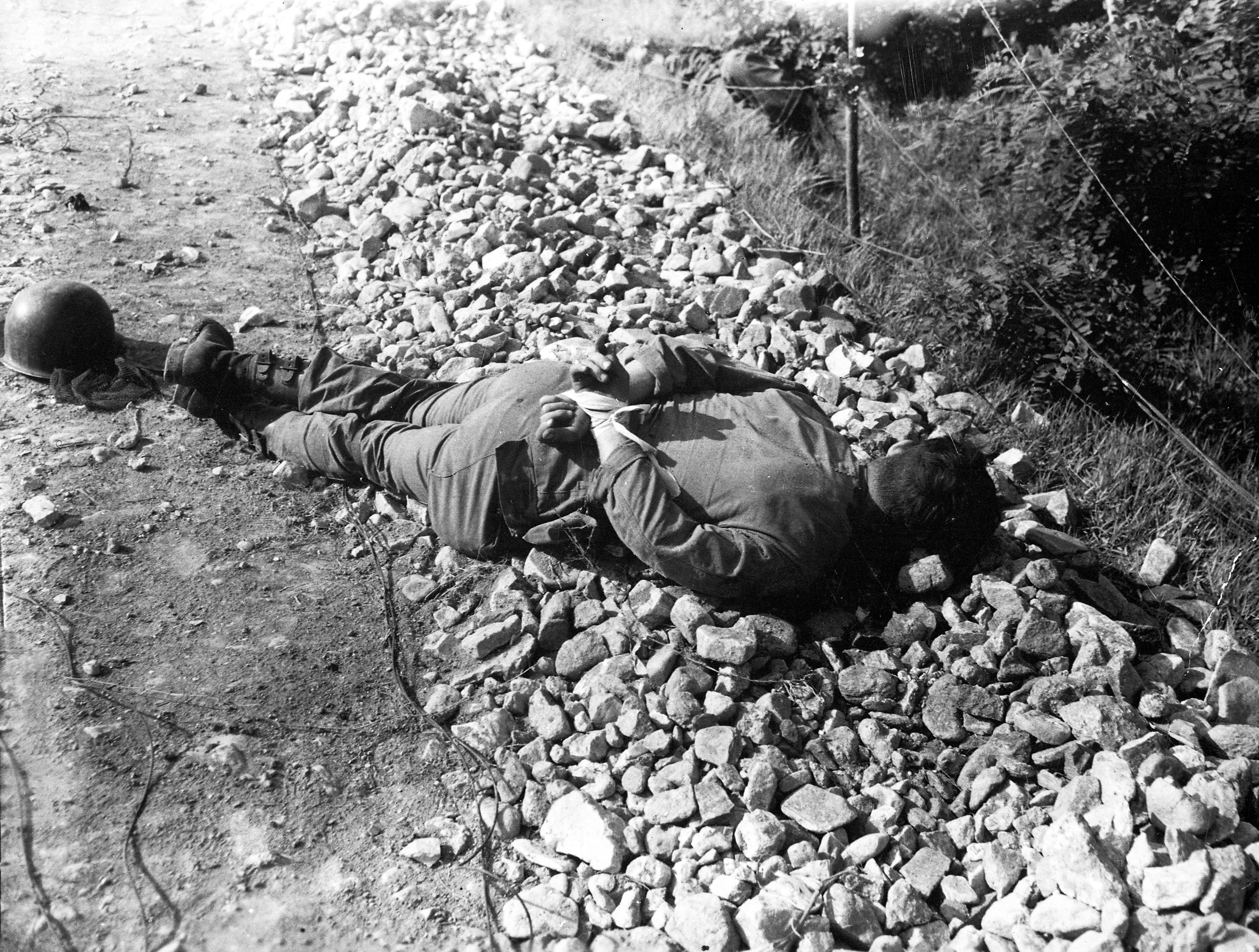
Soldier of the 21st Infantry Regiment, 24th Division, captured and executed by North Korean forces, 1950

The retreat quickly broke down into a confused and disorganized rout. Task Force Smith suffered its highest casualties during the withdrawal since its soldiers were the most exposed to enemy fire. The surviving members of Task Force Smith reached Battery A's position. The artillerymen disabled the five remaining howitzers by removing their sights and breechblocks and retired in good order with the remains of the task force on foot to the northern outskirts of Osan, where most of the unit's hidden transport vehicles were found intact. The vehicles, unmolested by the North Korean forces, departed for Pyongtaek and Cheonan, picking up stragglers along the way and eventually joined units of the 24th Infantry Division that had established a second line of defense.

Task Force Smith's force had 250 return to the American lines before nightfall, with about 150 more of the force killed, wounded, or missing. Most of the other stragglers found their way into the American lines over the next several days. The last stragglers from 2nd Platoon, B Company, reached Chonan five days later, only 30 minutes ahead of the North Korean Army. Upon the initial count, Task Force Smith suffered 20 killed in action, 130 wounded in action or missing in action, and around 36 captured. After the end of the war, the figures were revised to 60 dead, 21 wounded and 82 captured, 32 of whom died in captivity. That casualty count accounted for 40% of Task Force Smith. The US troops advancing northward during the Pusan breakout offensive would later discover a series of shallow graves containing the bodies of several soldiers of the 24th Infantry Division. All of them had been shot in the back of the head, with their hands bound behind their backs with communications wire. North Korean casualties were approximately 42 dead and 85 wounded, with four tanks destroyed or immobilized. The North Korean advance was delayed approximately seven hours.

== Aftermath ==
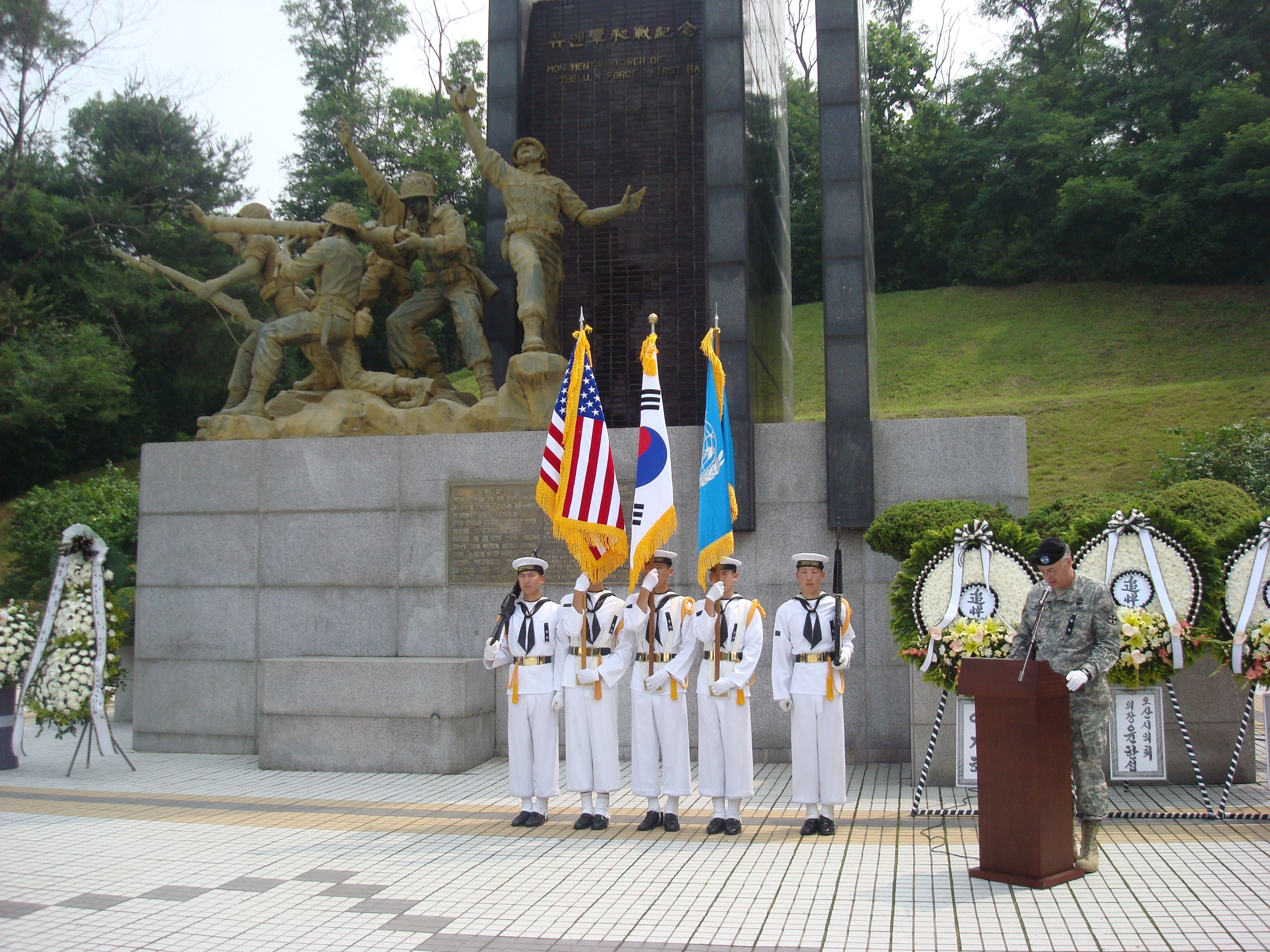
South Korean sailors in formation in front of the Task Force Smith memorial at Osan

The Battle of Osan was the first US ground action of the war. The fight showed that American forces were weak and unprepared for the war, and outdated equipment was insufficient to fight North Korean armor and poorly trained and inexperienced units were no match for better-trained North Korean troops, but the disparity in number of troops engaged certainly had a profound effect on the outcome of that battle and others. Undisciplined US troops abandoned their positions prematurely and left equipment and wounded for North Korean troops to capture. Smith also said he felt he had stayed too long in his position, which allowed North Korean troops to envelop the force and cause heavy casualties as it retreated. Those weaknesses would play out with other US units for the next month as North Korean troops pushed them further back.

Though the force was badly defeated, Task Force Smith accomplished its mission of delaying North Korean forces from advancing for several hours. During the battle, the 24th Infantry Division's 34th Infantry Regiment set up in Pyeongtaek, 15 mi (24 km) to the south. It would be similarly defeated at the Battle of Pyongtaek. Over the next month the 24th Infantry Division would fight in numerous engagements to delay North Korean forces with similar results. Within a week, the 24th Infantry Division had been pushed back to Taejon where it was again defeated in the Battle of Taejon. The North Koreans, repeatedly overwhelming US forces, pushed the Eighth Army all the way back to Pusan, where the Battle of the Pusan Perimeter would culminate in the eventual defeat of the North Korean Army.

Three months later, on September 19, Osan would be the location where the US and UN forces, under the command of the Eighth Army, advancing from the south, would meet up with forces of X Corps, advancing from the north after having recently surprised the North Koreans with the Inchon Landings, as both forces were in an offensive pushing the North Koreans back, which would culminate in a complete defeat of the North Korean Army in the south.

In the years after the Korean War, the US Army used the areas in Japan that Task Force Smith had trained as a memorial. A monument to Task Force Smith was also established on the Osan battlefield, where an annual commemoration of the Battle of Osan is held by the Eighth Army, which is still headquartered in South Korea. On July 16, 2010, sixty years after the Battle of Osan, Eighth Army leaders, in conjunction with government officials of Osan, held another ceremony, speaking of Task Force Smith and describing the engagement as "the opening shots of a war of ideas that exists even today." On the 61st anniversary, another ceremony was held by both the US military and Osan politicians to remember the task force.

== Memorial ==
There is a memorial park - 'Osan Jukmiryeong Peace Park' in Osan. This park has a museum and a monument and opened in July 2020.

== Sources ==
- Alexander, Bevin (2003), Korea: The First War we Lost, Hippocrene Books, ISBN 978-0-7818-1019-7
- Appleman, Roy E. (1998), South to the Naktong, North to the Yalu: United States Army in the Korean War, Washington, D.C.: Department of the Army, ISBN 978-0-16-001918-0, archived from the original on November 2, 2013
- Blair, Clay (2003), The Forgotten War: America in Korea, 1950–1953, Naval Institute Press, ISBN 978-1-59114-075-7
- Catchpole, Brian (2001), The Korean War, Robinson Publishing, ISBN 978-1-84119-413-4
- Fehrenbach, T.R. (2001), This Kind of War: The Classic Korean War History – Fiftieth Anniversary Edition, Potomac Books Inc., ISBN 978-1-57488-334-3
- Green, Michael; Green, Gladys (2000), Weapons of Patton's Armies, Zenith Imprint Press, ISBN 978-0-7603-0821-9
- Hackworth, David H.; Sherman, Julie (1989), About Face: The Odyssey of an American Warrior, Simon and Schuster, ISBN 978-0-671-52692-4
- Hanson, Thomas E. (2010), Combat ready?: the Eighth Army on the eve of the Korean War, College Station, Texas: Texas A&M University Press, ISBN 978-1-60344-167-4
- Malkasian, Carter (2001), The Korean War, Osprey Publishing, ISBN 978-1-84176-282-1
- Millett, Allan R. (2010), The War for Korea, 1950–1951: They Came from the North, University Press of Kansas, ISBN 978-0-7006-1709-8
- Sandler, Stanley (1999), The Korean War: no victors, no vanquished, Lexington, Kentucky: University Press of Kentucky, ISBN 978-0-8131-0967-1
- Summers, Harry G. (2001), Korean War Almanac, Replica Books, ISBN 978-0-7351-0209-5
- Varhola, Michael J. (2000), Fire and Ice: The Korean War, 1950–1953, Da Capo Press, ISBN 978-1-882810-44-4
