= Charles Bradford Smith =

United States Army general

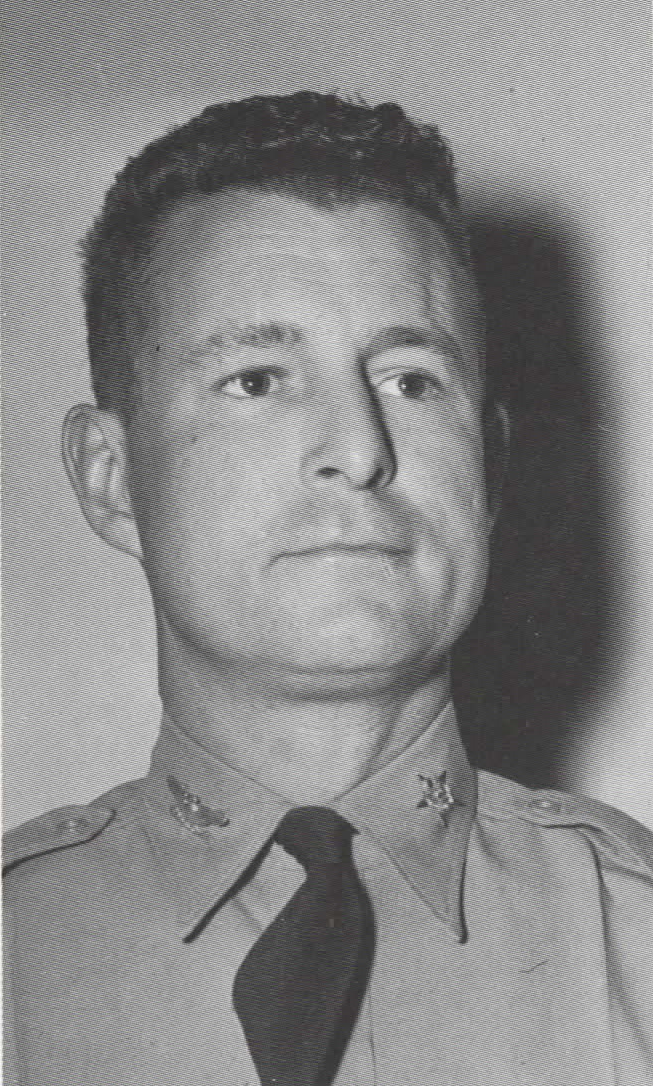
- Born: May 7, 1916; Lambertville, New Jersey, U.S.
- Died: May 27, 2004 (aged 88); Scottsdale, Arizona, U.S.
- Military career
- Allegiance: United States
- Branch: United States Army
- Service years: 1939–1966
- Rank: Brigadier general
- Commands: Task Force Smith; 15th Infantry Regiment
- Conflicts: World War II; Attack on Pearl Harbor; Korean War; Battle of Osan
- Awards: Distinguished Service Cross; Distinguished Service Medal; Silver Star; Legion of Merit; Bronze Star Medal; Taegeuk Order of Military Merit (South Korea)

Charles Bradford Smith (May 7, 1916 – May 27, 2004) was a United States Army officer who served in World War II and the Korean War. He received the Silver Star, the Distinguished Service Cross and Taegeuk Order of Military Merit for his actions in South Korea.

== Biography ==
Born in Lambertville, New Jersey, Smith attended the United States Military Academy, graduating in 1939. He married Bettie Evans in October 1941.

Captain Smith was at Schofield Barracks, Oahu during the Pearl Harbor attack.

When the Korean War began in 1950 the Lieutenant Colonel commanded the 1st Battalion of the 21st Infantry Regiment, part of the 24th Infantry Division. He led "Task Force Smith" at the Battle of Osan, for which he received the Distinguished Service Cross.

He reached the rank of brigadier general and eventually retired in 1965.

In his later life, Smith lived in Scottsdale, Arizona.
