= 105th Armored Division (North Korea) =

105th Guards Seoul Ryu Kyong-Su Armored Division
- 근위 서울류경수 제105땅크사단
- Guards badge
- Active: October 1948 – present
- Country: North Korea
- Branch: KPA Ground Force
- Type: Armored division Combined arms
- Role: Tank warfare
- Size: 6,000 men (June 1950)
- Part of: Korean People’s Army
- Garrison/HQ: Koksan County, North Hwanghae Province
- Engagements: Korean War: Operation Pokpung; First Battle of Seoul; Battle of Osan; Battle of the Pusan Perimeter; Great Naktong Offensive; UN September 1950 counteroffensive; UN offensive into North Korea
- Decorations: Guards Badge

Commanders
- Current commander: Major General O Jong-su
- Notable commanders: Major General Ryu Kyong-Su

Insignia
- Flag: Front: Back:

The 105th Guards Seoul Ryu Kyong-Su Armored Division is an elite armored military formation of the Korean People's Army. It was North Korea's first armored unit and took part with T-34-85 tanks in the Korean War.

== History ==
=== Korean War ===
In the first days of the Korean War, under the command of Major General Ryu Kyong-Su, the 105th Armored Brigade reached Seoul on 28 June. It was then raised to division status and renamed the 105th Guards Seoul Ryu Kyong-Su Armored Division before crossing the Han River to continue the attack southward. The division was part of the North Korean advance from Seoul to Taejon and subsequent Battle of Pusan Perimeter between August and September 1950. The 107th Tank Regiment, equipped with T-34 tanks, defeated Task Force Smith during the initial advances of the Korean People's Army. The regiment then fought with the rest of the division in the Battle of Pusan Perimeter. After taking part in the Great Naktong Offensive, the 105th Armored Division was partly reconstituted and at the end of October and the first week of November 1950, it was committed to help the Chinese. The division used its tanks to provide fire support on a few occasions, but it played a negligible role in the fighting that followed and the U.S. Fifth Air Force destroyed most of its tanks behind the battle front. On November 7, U.N. aircraft reportedly destroyed six tanks, three armored cars, and 45 vehicles in Pakchon and the area eastward.

=== Later service ===
The 105th Armored Division is at present equipped with Chonma-ho and Pokpung-ho tanks.

== Formation and structure ==
The division was established in October 1948 as the 105th Armored Battalion and given its unit colors by Kim Il Sung a month later. It increased to regimental strength in May 1949. By June 1950, the 105th Armored Regiment had become the 105th Armored Brigade with a strength of 6,000 men and 120 T-34 tanks. Its equipment – tanks, weapons and vehicles – was Soviet-made.

The brigade had three tank regiments – the 107th, 109th, and 203rd – and a mechanized infantry regiment, the 206th. The 83d Motorized Regiment was also part of the division during the Korean War. Each tank regiment had three medium tank battalions, each having 13 tanks. Each tank battalion had three tank companies with four tanks to a company. Tank crews consisted of five men. Battalion, regimental, and divisional commanders each had a personal tank. The mechanized infantry regiment had a strength of about 2,500 men. The SU-76 self-propelled guns were equipped and tank crews of four men.
