= Bevin Alexander =

American military historian and author (born 1929)

Bevin Alexander (born 17 February 1929 in Gastonia, North Carolina, United States) is an American military historian and author. He served as an officer during the Korean War as part of the 5th Historical Detachment. His book Korea: The First War We Lost was largely influenced by his experiences during the war.

Bevin has served as a consultant and adviser to several groups due to his military expertise, including work for the Rand Corporation, work as a consultant for military simulations instituted by the United States Army Training and Doctrine Command, and as director of information at the University of Virginia in Charlottesville, Virginia. He is a retired adjunct professor of Longwood University in Farmville, Virginia.

== Awards and honors ==
Bevin's Lost Victories: The Military Genius of Stonewall Jackson was honored by the Civil War Book Review, an academic publication of the United States Civil War Center at Louisiana State University, when it was named one of the seventeen books that have most reshaped Civil War scholarship.

== Works ==
- Korea: The First War We Lost (1987)
- The Strange Connection: U.S. Intervention in China, 1944-1972 (1992)
- How Great Generals Win (1993)
- The Future of Warfare (1995)
- Robert E. Lee's Civil War (1999)
- How Hitler Could Have Won World War II: The Fatal Errors That Led to Nazi Defeat (2001)
- How Wars Are Won: The 13 Rules of War from Ancient Greece to the War on Terror (2003)
- Lost Victories: The Military Genius of Stonewall Jackson (2004)
- How America Got It Right: The U.S. March to Military and Political Supremacy (2006)
- How the South Could Have Won the Civil War: The Fatal Errors That Led to Confederate Defeat (2007)
- Inside the Nazi War Machine: How Three Generals Unleashed Hitler's Blitzkrieg Upon the World (2010)
- Sun Tzu at Gettysburg: Ancient Military Wisdom in the Modern World (2011)
- MacArthur's War (2013)
- Such Troops as These: The Genius and Leadership of Confederate General Stonewall Jackson (2014)
