= Mitchell Red Cloud Jr. =

United States Army Medal of Honor recipient

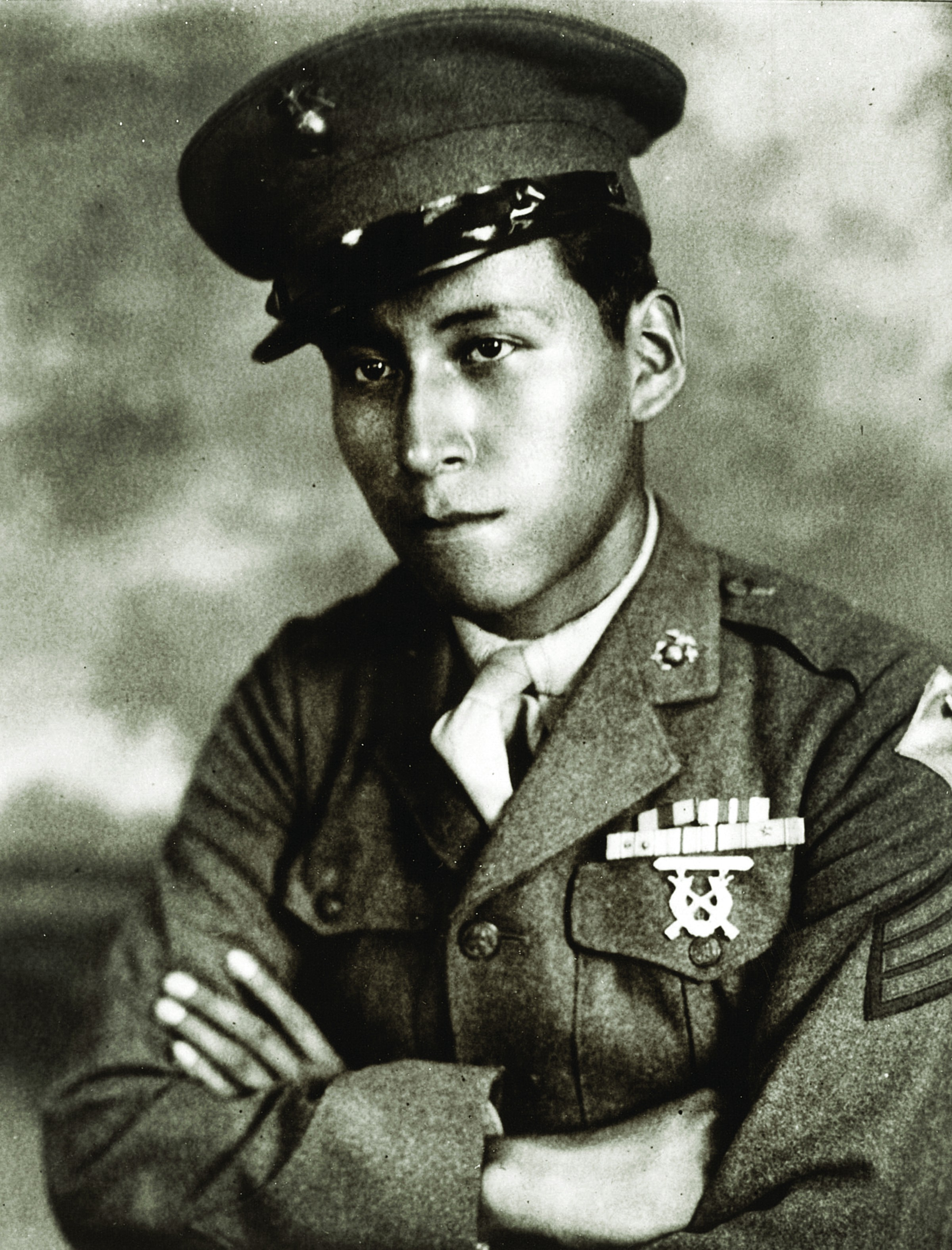
- Red Cloud in his Marine Corps uniform
- Born: 2 July 1925; Hatfield, Wisconsin, United States
- Died: 5 November 1950 (aged 25) near Chonghyon, North Pyongan Province, North Korea
- Burial place: Winnebago Mission, Wisconsin
- Military career
- Allegiance: United States
- Branch: United States Marine Corps; United States Army
- Service years: 1941–1945 (USMC); 1948–1950 (USA)
- Rank: Sergeant (USMC); Corporal (USA)
- Service number: 16299515
- Units: 2nd Marine Raider Battalion; 29th Marine Regiment; 19th Infantry Regiment
- Conflicts: World War II; Battle of Guadalcanal; Battle of Okinawa; Korean War; Battle of Taejon; Battle of Pusan Perimeter; Chinese First Phase Campaign †
- Awards: Medal of Honor; Purple Heart Medal (2)

Mitchell Red Cloud Jr. (2 July 1925 – 5 November 1950) was a United States Army Corporal who was killed in action while serving in the Korean War. Corporal Red Cloud posthumously received the Medal of Honor for heroic actions "above and beyond the call of duty" near Chonghyon, North Korea, on 5 November 1950 during the Chinese First Phase Campaign. Before joining the army, he had been a United States Marine Corps sergeant who had served in World War II.

Born in Hatfield, Wisconsin, Red Cloud, a Ho-Chunk Native American, dropped out of high school to enlist in the Marine Corps during World War II. He first served in combat with the Marine Raiders during the Battle of Guadalcanal in 1942 before health problems forced him stateside in 1943 to recover. Red Cloud avoided a medical discharge, and served with the 6th Marine Division during the Battle of Okinawa in 1945.

Red Cloud enlisted in the U.S. Army in 1948. After the Korean War began in June 1950, he was sent to Korea with the 19th Infantry, 24th Infantry Division, which was among the American troops who fought the first battles of the war, being pushed back during the Battle of Taejon and the Battle of Pusan Perimeter. The 19th Infantry also was part of the Eighth United States Army advance into North Korea. On the night of 5 November 1950, Red Cloud was manning a forward observation post when he spotted an imminent surprise attack by Chinese forces. Red Cloud single-handedly held off the Chinese forces despite being shot eight times, at one point ordering his men to tie him to a tree because he was too weak to stand by himself. His company found him the next morning, surrounded by dead Chinese troops. He was credited with alerting his company to the ambush and saving them from being overrun. For these actions, he was posthumously awarded the Medal of Honor.

== Early life ==
Mitchell Red Cloud Jr. was born on 2 July 1925 in Hatfield, Wisconsin. He was the eldest son of Mitchell Red Cloud and Lillian Red Cloud. The family were ethnic members of the Ho-Chunk Native American tribe. Red Cloud attended Neillsville High School in Neillsville, Wisconsin. The school taught primarily Native American students, a large portion of whom joined the military after finishing school. At age 16, Red Cloud dropped out of high school and, with his father's approval, decided to enlist in the United States Marine Corps.

== Military service ==
=== U.S. Marine Corps ===
He entered the Marine Corps on 11 August 1941, the earliest date on which he was legally allowed to enlist. The family may have relocated to Merrillan, Wisconsin, which was where Red Cloud enlisted. He was assigned to the 2nd Battalion, 9th Marines at Camp Elliot, California.

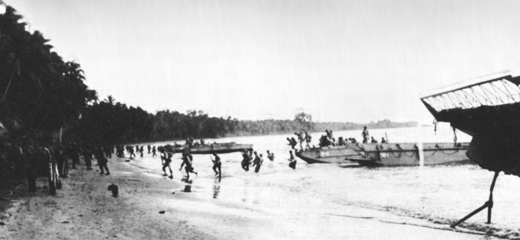
Carlson's raiders come ashore on Guadalcanal, on 4 November 1942

With World War II looming, Red Cloud volunteered for and was accepted on April 14, 1942, by the 2nd Marine Raider Battalion, also known as "Carlson's Raiders", under the command of Lieutenant Colonel Evans Carlson. He was placed in Weapons Platoon, F Company of the battalion. As an elite Marine light infantry unit, the Raiders held high standards of physical and mental fitness, and was known to perform very well with this unit. His only major deployment with the Raiders was the Battle of Guadalcanal. Red Cloud landed with his company off of the USS McKean (DD-90) at Aola Bay on Guadalcanal, on 4 November 1942. On 6 November, the 2nd Raider Battalion went into the jungle to begin "The Long Patrol" for the next 28 days. Their mission was to silence Japanese artillery firing on Henderson Field. They would also conduct a number of mopping up operations to assist in the clearance of the island and to cut off troops from the Empire of Japan who had been attempting to escape. Red Cloud's time on Guadalcanal was plagued by several bouts of tropical disease, and he left the island on 4 December 1942 for medical treatment. The patrol also caused him to lose 75 pounds.

During his time overseas, Red Cloud contracted diseases frequently, and he was returned to the United States in February 1943 to recuperate. The navy doctors in San Diego that examined Red Cloud offered him a medical discharge, but Red Cloud refused. Instead, he recovered from illness and requested reassignment to a combat unit. This request was granted, with Red Cloud subsequently assigned to Weapons Platoon, A Company, 29th Marine Regiment, 6th Marine Division, which participated in the invasion of Okinawa on 1 April 1945. On 17 May, he was shot in the shoulder and evacuated to Guam. In the ensuing Battle of Okinawa, his unit saw intense fighting in the campaign to secure the island. After several months of fighting, the unit was withdrawn to Guam to prepare for Operation Coronet, the second phase of the anticipated invasion of mainland Japan. However, these plans were scrapped following the surrender of Japan. Red Cloud was honorably discharged as a sergeant from the Marine Corps on 9 November 1945 during the demobilization that followed the war.

=== Inter-service years ===
In December 1945, Red Cloud published an article in the Wisconsin Archaeologist, an account from his tribe's traditional stories about the 1832 surrender of Sauk leader Black Hawk to US authorities after the short Black Hawk War. In the article, he expressed support for historical theories that Black Hawk had voluntarily surrendered. He also assisted anthropologist Nancy Lurie, informing her studies of how childcare customs among Native Americans were changing over time.

In the inter-service years, Red Cloud married and had a daughter, Annita.

=== U.S. Army ===
24th Infantry Division shoulder sleeve patch

Red Cloud decided to return to the military in 1948. He enlisted in the United States Army and was assigned to E Company, 2nd Battalion, 19th Infantry Regiment, 24th Infantry Division. The regiment was part of the Occupation of Japan, and Red Cloud was assigned to Kyushu. During this time, training opportunities were limited, many of the troops were inexperienced and their equipment was of low quality due to budget cuts. On joining the army, Red Cloud was not permitted to retain his sergeant rank from the Marine Corps.

With the outbreak of the Korean War on 25 June 1950, the 24th Infantry Division was the closest unit to the Korean Peninsula, and in July, Red Cloud's company was among the first units into the country. The division was heavily engaged throughout July by North Korean troops as it attempted to stem their invasion of South Korea, and the 19th Infantry saw action in the Battle of Taejon, fighting at the Kum River before being forced out of Taejon.

The unit subsequently moved back to the Naktong River, and was involved in the subsequent Pusan Perimeter campaign during August and September 1950. During the First Battle of Naktong Bulge, the 19th Infantry was moved up from reserve positions in to combat the NK 4th Division, which was attempting to break through their lines. Having been badly mauled in these fights, the division was moved into reserve along the Pusan Perimeter on 23 September. It was replaced by units of the 2nd Infantry Division. In the subsequent Great Naktong Offensive, the 19th Infantry served as a reserve force to help units under attack in the Second Battle of Naktong Bulge. The 19th Infantry would later participate in the Battle of Kyongju, assisting troops of the Republic of Korea Army to help push back North Korean troops from the Kyongju area. During these battles, Red Cloud's experience as a combat veteran made him a valued member of his unit for leading the less experienced troops.

Following the Battle of Inchon and subsequent Second Battle of Seoul, the North Korean Army was largely defeated, and the 19th Infantry was one of the units of the Eighth United States Army which pursued the fleeing North Koreans north of the 38th Parallel with the intention of reuniting the country. However, beginning in October 1950, the People's Republic of China conducted the First Phase Offensive, a surprise attack against the advancing United Nations forces, which were unprepared to counter the offensive. By early November, Red Cloud and his unit had advanced to the Ch'ongch'on River.

==== Medal of Honor action ====
On the night of 5 November, E Company, 2nd Battalion, 19th infantry was holding positions on Hill 123, near Chonghyon, just north of the river.

Red Cloud, then a corporal, was manning a forward listening post in front of his company's command post position on the hill. In the middle of the night, he began hearing suspicious noises, before spotting a number of Chinese troops intent on surprising the Americans. Red Cloud raised an alarm and began firing on the advancing Chinese troops with an M1918 Browning Automatic Rifle (BAR). The assistant BAR man with him in their foxhole was killed by the Chinese returning fire. Red Cloud was then shot twice in the chest. In spite of these wounds and after being attended to by a company platoon medic, he refused to withdraw from his post, and continued to fire accurately on the Chinese troops which caused significant casualties among their advancing force. Crucially, his actions alerted his company to the impending attack, preventing an ambush. After he was hit again and attended to by the same medic, Red Cloud propped himself against a tree and continued to fire, exposing himself to intense Chinese fire. He was shot at least eight times in the firefight. Suffering from severe injuries and too weak to support himself, he ordered a soldier near him, to tie him upright to the tree using the soldier's web belt, and then ordered these men to withdraw with the other wounded men to the main positions. Eventually, the Chinese overran Red Cloud's position and the hill.

Red Cloud's actions gave E Company time and warning to blunt the Chinese offensive, eventually repelling the attack. His actions are also credited with allowing his company to evacuate several others wounded in the attack. When members of the 2nd Battalion returned to the hill and arrived at Red Cloud's position to recover his body the next morning, they found it was surrounded by a large number of dead Chinese troops.

== Burial and honors ==
Red Cloud was initially buried at a UN cemetery in Korea. However, in 1955, his body was exhumed and moved to Wisconsin, where he was buried in accordance with Ho-Chunk tribal customs. He was interred at the Decorah Cemetery at Winnebago Mission, Wisconsin.

In April 1951, Red Cloud's mother received the Medal of Honor from General of the Army Omar Bradley in a ceremony at The Pentagon in Washington, D.C.

On Armed Forces Day, 18 May 1957, the United States Army named Camp Red Cloud in South Korea after him, in recognition of his actions. Red Cloud Range on Fort Benning, Georgia, was also named for Red Cloud.

A park in La Crosse, Wisconsin, was dedicated in Red Cloud's honor. A memorial park was dedicated in his memory, the Red Cloud Highway Memorial Park adjacent to the Black Hawk Powwow Grounds in Komensky, Wisconsin. A portion of Wisconsin Highway 54 was renamed Red Cloud Highway. The American Legion post in Adams, Wisconsin, was renamed for him. The Ho-Chunk Nation observes Corporal Mitchell Red Cloud Jr. Day on each 4th of July.

In 1967, a monument was erected for him in the cemetery. Another plaque honoring Red Cloud was subsequently erected in Black River Falls.

In 1999, the United States Navy named the newly commissioned USNS Red Cloud (T-AKR-313), a Watson-class vehicle cargo ship and Large, Medium-Speed Roll-on/Roll-off ship, in his honor. The ship was christened by his daughter Annita, who was dressed in traditional regalia. It was attended by several men who served alongside her father as well as several flag officers.

Fort Novosel dedicated a road to Red Cloud on the Post. Red Cloud Road, it depicts a sign with a brief writeup of his Medal of honor citation.

== Documentary ==
Mitchell Red Cloud Jr. is one of the featured Korean War heroes honored in the 2013 documentary "Finnigan's War" directed by Conor Timmis. Actor Mark Hamill narrates Red Cloud's Medal of Honor citation in the film.

== Military awards ==
Red Cloud's military awards and decorations include:

Combat Infantryman Badge
Medal of Honor	Purple Heart Medal w/ Oak Leaf Cluster	Navy Presidential Unit Citation w/ 3/16" bronze star
Marine Corps Good Conduct Medal	American Campaign Medal	Asiatic-Pacific Campaign Medal w/ two 3/16" bronze stars
World War II Victory Medal	National Defense Service Medal	Korean Service Medal w/ three 3/16" bronze stars
Republic of Korea Presidential Unit Citation	United Nations Service Medal for Korea	Korean War Service Medal (Note: In 2000 this award was made retroactive to all US military personnel who served in the Korean War.)

=== Medal of Honor citation ===
Red Cloud's official Medal of Honor citation reads:

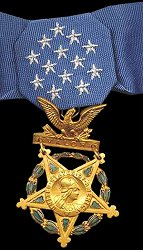
Medal of Honor

Rank and organization: Corporal, E Company, 2nd Battalion, 19th Infantry Regiment, 24th Infantry Division
Place and date: Near Chonghyon, Korea, 5 November 1950
Entered service at: Merrillan, Wisconsin

General Orders No. 26, 25 April 1951

The President of the United States in the name of The Congress takes pride in presenting the MEDAL OF HONOR posthumously to

Corporal Mitchell Red Cloud Jr.
United States Army

Citation:

Cpl. Red Cloud, Company E, distinguished himself by conspicuous gallantry and intrepidity above and beyond the call of duty in action against the enemy. From his position on the point of a ridge immediately in front of the company command post he was the first to detect the approach of the Chinese Communist forces and give the alarm as the enemy charged from a brush-covered area less than 100 feet from him. Springing up, he delivered devastating pointblank automatic rifle fire into the advancing enemy. His accurate and intense fire checked this assault and gained time for the company to consolidate its defense. With utter fearlessness he maintained his firing position until severely wounded by enemy fire. Refusing assistance he pulled himself to his feet and, wrapping his arm around a tree, continued his deadly fire again, until he was fatally wounded. This heroic act stopped the enemy from overrunning his company's position and gained time for reorganization and evacuation of the wounded. Cpl. Red Cloud's dauntless courage and gallant self-sacrifice reflects the highest credit upon himself and upholds the esteemed traditions of the U.S. Army.

/S/ Harry S. Truman

== See also ==
- List of Korean War Medal of Honor recipients
- Red Cloud
