= Battle of Hwanggan =

Engagement between United States and North Korean forces

- Part of Korean War
Date	July 23–29, 1950
Location	North of Hwanggan, South Korea
Result	North Korean victory

Belligerents
United Nations: United States	North Korea

Commanders and leaders
John H. Michaelis	Lee Ch'ong Song

Units involved
27th Infantry Regiment	2nd Division

Strength
3,000	10,000?

Casualties and losses
53 killed 221 wounded 49 missing	3,000; 6 T-34 tanks

The Battle of Hwanggan was an engagement between United States and North Korean forces that took place on July 23–29, 1950, on a road north of the village of Hwanggan in southern South Korea, early in the Korean War. The battle ended in a victory for the North Koreans after US troops were forced to withdraw south.

The US Army's 27th Infantry Regiment, 25th Infantry Division, newly arrived in Korea, was moved to a road north of Hwanggan to block the North Korean Korean People's Army (KPA)'s 2nd Division, advancing following the Battle of Taejon. In an unusually good first performance, the 27th Infantry was able to delay the North Korean division for almost a week, inflicting heavy casualties on it while suffering few casualties of their own.

The North Koreans eventually were able to overwhelm the US forces with sheer numbers, capturing Hwanggan and pushing the American units further south. However, the action solidified the 27th Infantry's position as a valuable reserve unit for the US Eighth Army during the Battle of Pusan Perimeter. The 27th distinguished itself in several critical battles, including the Battle of the Bowling Alley.

== Background ==
=== Outbreak of war ===
Following the invasion of South Korea by North Korea, and the subsequent outbreak of the Korean War, the United Nations decided to commit troops to the conflict on behalf of South Korea. The United States sent ground forces to the Korean peninsula with the goal of fighting back the North Korean invasion and to prevent South Korea from collapsing. However, US forces in the Far East had been steadily decreasing since the end of World War II in 1945, and at the time the closest forces were the 24th Infantry Division of the Eighth Army, which was headquartered in Japan. The division was understrength, and most of its equipment was antiquated due to reductions in military spending. Regardless, the 24th Infantry Division was ordered into South Korea.

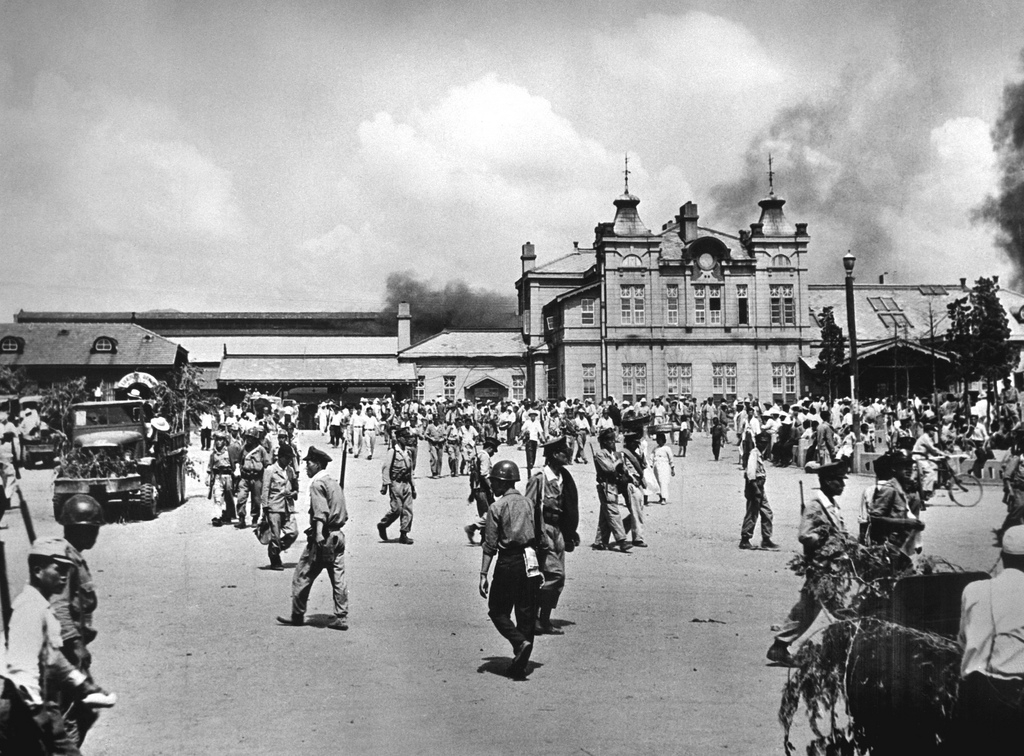
US forces retreat during the Battle of Taejon

The 24th Infantry Division was the first US unit sent into Korea with the mission to take the initial "shock" of North Korean advances, delaying much larger North Korean units to buy time to allow follow-on forces to arrive. The division was consequently outnumbered and outgunned for several weeks as it attempted to delay the North Koreans, making time for the 7th Infantry Division, 25th Infantry Division, 1st Cavalry Division and other Eighth Army supporting units to move into position. Republic of Korea Army (ROK) forces in the meantime were systematically defeated and forced south along Korea's east coast, with entire divisions being overrun by the KPA' superior firepower and equipment. Advance elements of the 24th Infantry Division were badly defeated in the Battle of Osan on July 5, during the first battle between American and North Korean forces. For the first month after the defeat of Task Force Smith, 24th Infantry Division soldiers were repeatedly defeated and forced south by the KPA's superior numbers and equipment. The regiments of the 24th Infantry Division were systematically pushed south in battles around Chochiwon, Chonan, and Pyongtaek. The 24th Infantry Division made a final stand in the Battle of Taejon, being almost completely destroyed in the process but delaying North Korean forces from advancing until July 20. By that time, the Eighth Army's force of combat troops was roughly equal to North Korean forces attacking the region at around 70,000 for each side, with new UN units arriving every day.

=== North Korean advance ===
In the east, the North Koreans advanced immediately after taking Taejon. Four North Korean divisions split up and approached the UN lines along separate routes. The KPA 15th Division was the first to move against the US 25th Infantry Division in the Battle of Sangju on July 20, where the division's US 24th Infantry would be quickly pushed back by the North Korean advance. In the meantime, the KPA 3rd Division engaged the newly arrived US 1st Cavalry at the Battle of Yongdong on July 22, where that division would also perform poorly. The KPA 6th Division moved further south, where it would confront the US 29th Infantry Regiment at the Hadong Ambush on July 27, effectively destroying one of the regiment's battalions. The US units were performing extremely poorly in their first engagements against North Korean units, as a combination of shortages of supplies and lack of experienced soldiers and officers plagued the UN forces at this stage of the war.

== Battle ==
=== 27th Infantry advance ===
As other North Korean forces were closing on Yongdong, the KPA 2nd Division continued its advance down the road from Hwanggan to Poun, having arrived in Taejon too late for the fight there. Its orders were to pass through that town and come out on the main Seoul–Pusan highway at Hwanggan, about 10 miles (16 km) east of Yongdong, placing it in the rear of the 1st Cavalry Division and on its main supply road.

Responding to the threat, the Eighth Army ordered the US 27th Infantry Regiment, 25th Infantry Division to block the advance. After arriving in Korea, the regiment went to the Uisong area, 35 miles (56 km) north of Taegu. On July 13, it moved from there to Andong to support ROK troops, but before it entered action in the fight in that city, it suddenly received orders to move to Sangju to assist the 25th Infantry Division's other two regiments in that battle. En route, it received still other orders to change its destination to Hwanggan, and it closed there in an assembly area on the night of July 22–23. The 27th Infantry's mission at Hwanggan was to relieve the exhausted and decimated ROK units retreating down the Poun road. In the meantime it lost large numbers of its experienced officers as they were shifted to the US 24th Infantry.

In carrying out Eighth Army's orders to block the Poun road, regimental commander Colonel John H. Michaelis, a West Point graduate known as an effective commander, assigned the 1st Battalion, 27th Infantry, to make contact with the first North Korean attacks. On the morning of July 23, Lieutenant Colonel Gilbert J. Check moved the 1st Battalion northward toward Poun from the Hwanggan assembly area. He took up defensive positions in the evening near the village of Sangyong-ni, south of Poun. The battalion assumed responsibility for that sector at 17:00 after South Korean troops fell back through its position. However, the battalion was unable to ascertain from the retreating soldiers the KPA 2nd Division's status or threat.

=== North Korean attack ===
In the evening of July 23, 1st Battalion sent a 30-man patrol northward to locate the North Koreans. Near Poun, the patrol spotted a KPA column approaching. The platoon took up superior positions and ambushed the column as it passed with all its weapons. The North Koreans halted their advance, thinking they had encountered a major position, and held back until daylight. When they turned back, the US patrol returned to the 1st Battalion lines at 04:00 on July 24. It suffered six men missing to an unknown number of North Korean casualties.

Check's 1st Battalion was not attacked until 06:30 on July 24, shortly after daybreak in a heavy fog that allowed the North Koreans to approach very close to the US positions before they were observed. Two US infantry companies on either side of the road on low ridges held the forward positions. KPA mortar fire fell on the men there, and then T-34 tanks appeared at the bend in the road and opened fire with their main cannons and machine guns as they approached. KPA infantry followed the tanks. Although the two rifle companies stopped the KPA infantry, the tanks penetrated their positions and fired into the battalion command post which was behind B Company. This tank fire destroyed several vehicles and killed the medical officer. A company commander knocked out one tank but was injured in the process.

On the right flank, north of the road, the North Koreans overran the battalion observation post and B Company's outpost line. This high ground changed hands three times during the day. While the infantry fight was in progress, and shortly after the first tank penetration, five more T-34s came around the road bend toward the US 71st Tank Battalion. Check had called for an air strike when the first tanks appeared. Three F-80 Shooting Stars arrived and immediately dived on the approaching group of tanks, destroying three of them with 5-inch rockets. Altogether, bazooka, artillery, and air strikes knocked out six North Korean tanks during the morning, either within or on the edge of the 1st Battalion position. In its first engagement with American troops, the KPA 2nd Division lost all but two of the eight tanks that had been attached to it a few days earlier at Chongju.

=== US withdrawal to Hwanggan ===
The fight continued into the evening, and after dark the 1st Battalion disengaged and withdrew through the 2nd Battalion immediately behind it. Both Check and the regimental commander, Michaelis, expected the North Koreans to encircle the 1st Battalion position during the night if it stayed where it was.

The North Koreans were apparently unaware of the 1st Battalion withdrawal, because the next morning, July 25, two North Korean battalions in a double envelopment came in behind the positions 1st Battalion held the night before, but in front of Major Gordon E. Murch's 2nd Battalion. There the KPA were caught in the open by the combined fire of American tanks, artillery, and mortar, and the 2nd Battalion's automatic and small arms fire. The KPA suffered large numbers of casualties in this attack. Surviving remnants of the two KPA battalions withdrew in confusion. The 2nd Battalion took about 30 prisoners.

The KPA 2nd Division pushed forward in spite of the casualties, and that afternoon elements of it were flanking the 27th Infantry's main position. Michaelis issued an order about 22:00 for another withdrawal to high ground near Hwanggan. The withdrawal started near midnight with heavy fighting still in progress on the right flank. Murch took control of all nine US tanks and put them on line facing north, where they attacked North Korean troops approaching on the road. Mortar fire fell along the battalion line and the road behind it. F Company and the nine tanks covered the 2nd Battalion withdrawal.

=== Second defensive line ===
On July 26, the US 1st Battalion, 35th Infantry Regiment arrived on the 27th Infantry's right flank. However, the next day the regimental left flank came under attack where a large gap existed between C Company, the westernmost unit of the 27th Infantry and the US 7th Cavalry Regiment, the nearest unit of the 1st Cavalry Division. C Company lost and regained a peak three times during the day. More than 40 casualties reduced its strength to approximately 60 men. B Company also lost heavily in action, falling to a strength of about 85 men. By the morning of July 28 the North Koreans had penetrated the 1st Battalion's line, forcing C Company to withdraw in the face of heavy KPA infantry attack.

At this point Colonel Michaelis went to the 1st Cavalry Division command post in Hwanggan and asked division commander Major General Hobart R. Gay for permission to withdraw his regiment through that division. Gay telephoned the Eighth Army headquarters and asked if he should attack in an effort to relieve the pressure on the 27th Infantry or if that regiment should withdraw into the 1st Cavalry Division's area, move south to Kumch'on, and then turn toward Sangju to rejoin the 25th Division. The Eighth Army decided the 27th Regiment should withdraw, as Gay feared it would quickly be surrounded if it tried to hold its position.

Before dawn on July 29, the 27th Infantry Regiment withdrew through the 1st Cavalry Division lines at Hwanggan to a position about 1 mile (1.6 km) east of Kumch'on. That afternoon Michaelis received orders from Eighth Army to move to Waegwan on the Naktong River near Daegu, as army reserve, instead of joining the 25th Division in the Sangju area.

== Aftermath ==
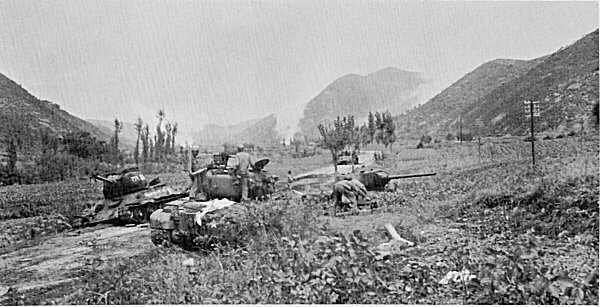
Tanks of the 27th Infantry advance into the Bowling Alley, August 21.

The 27th Infantry Regiment lost 53 men killed, 221 wounded, and 49 missing, a total of 323 battle casualties during the battles along the Hwanggan road. However, it was able to delay the North Korean division for five days in this effort. The KPA 2nd Division suffered heavily during this time to US artillery and armor, some estimates placing its losses above 3,000 men in the battles along the road. The US 1st Cavalry Division initially took the 27th Infantry's place on the line, but retreated without engaging the KPA 2nd Division after movement by the KPA 3rd Division threatened to take Kumch'on and block the 1st Cavalry's route of supply. The division was driven to the Naktong River by July 31, having taken 916 casualties at Hwanggan and Sangju in its first ten days on the line. Tactically, the North Koreans had been successful in pushing the US forces south and capturing the ground, but the American units had bought strategically valuable time to set up the Pusan Perimeter.

The battle set the standard for the 27th Infantry, which performed unusually well in the fight. In contrast, other units of both the 25th Infantry and 1st Cavalry Divisions in their first engagements at Yongdong and Sangju performed very poorly, prompting Walker to order the US forces to stop retreating, and "stand or die." The US 27th Infantry was used as an emergency reserve during the Battle of Pusan Perimeter, where it particularly distinguished itself at the Battle of the Bowling Alley. The regiment's quality performance in the Hwanggan fight was crucial in the decision to make it a "fire brigade."
