= Black Hawk Powwow Grounds =

Coordinates: 44.335414°N 90.738403°W

- U.S. National Register of Historic Places
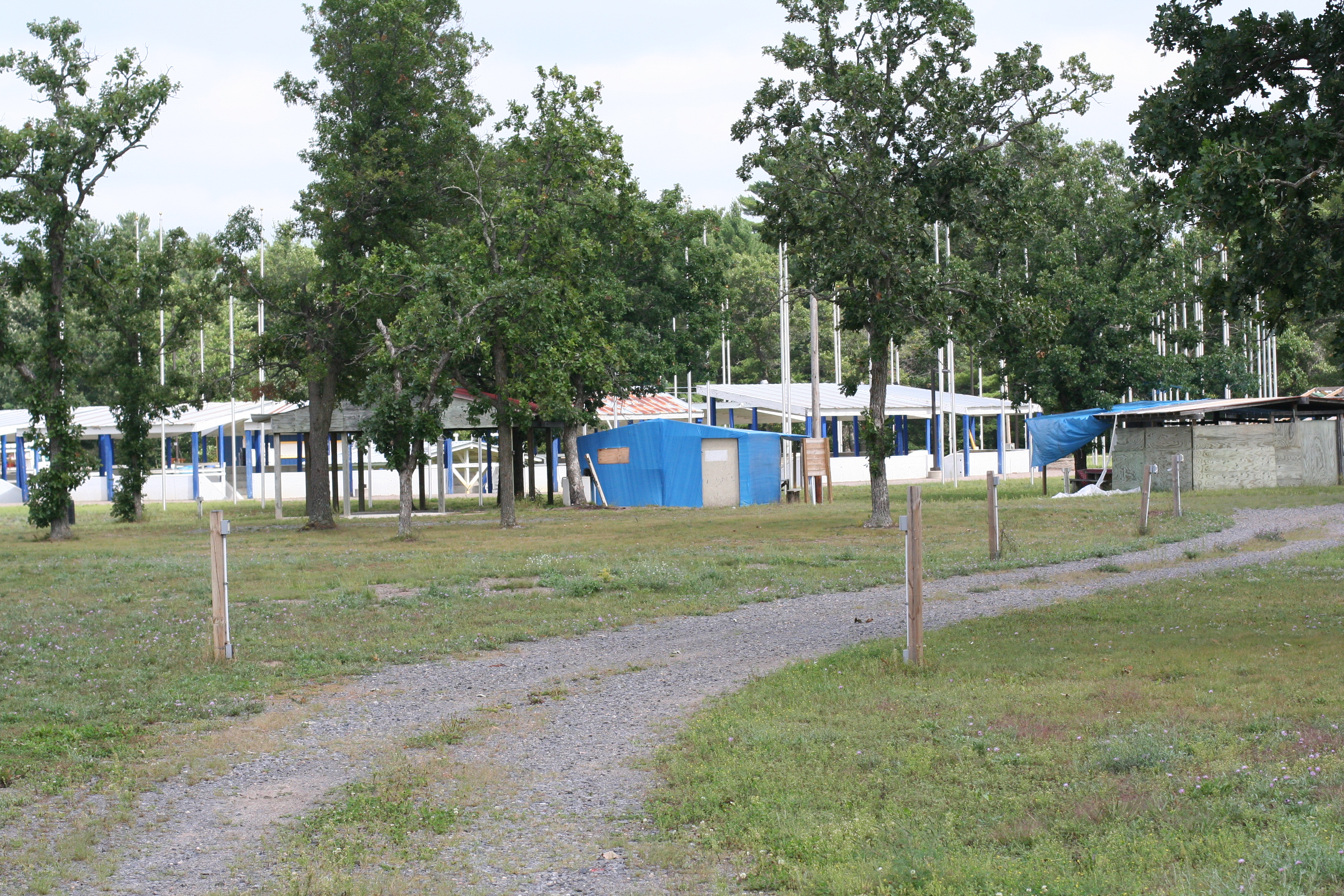
- Location: Komensky, Wisconsin
- NRHP reference No.: 07000244
- Added to NRHP: March 28, 2007

The Black Hawk Powwow Grounds are located in Komensky, Wisconsin. In 2007, the site was added to the National Register of Historic Places.

== History ==
The grounds have been used by the Ho-Chunk for ceremonial and other purposes since the 1800s. Adjacent to grounds is a marker honoring Mitchell Red Cloud, Jr. Red Cloud, who was born in the place of Hatfield, Wisconsin located within Komensky, was the grandson of a Ho-Chunk chief and received the Medal of Honor for his actions during the Korean War.
