= Hatfield, Wisconsin =

Census-designated place in Wisconsin, United States

- Census-designated place
- Location within Wisconsin Location within the United States
- Coordinates: 44°24′53″N 90°43′51″W
- Country: United States
- State: Wisconsin
- County: Jackson
- Town: Komensky

Area
  - Total: 1.337 sq mi (3.46 km^{2})
  - Land: 1.337 sq mi (3.46 km^{2})
  - Water: 0 sq mi (0 km^{2})
- Elevation: 889 ft (271 m)

Population (2010)
  - Total: 141
  - Density: 105/sq mi (40.7/km^{2})
- Time zone: UTC-6 (Central (CST))
  - Summer (DST): UTC-5 (CDT)
- Area codes: 715 & 534
- GNIS feature ID: 1566129

Hatfield is an unincorporated census-designated place, in the town of Komensky, Jackson County, Wisconsin, United States. As of the 2020 census, Hatfield had a population of 176.

== Geography ==
Hatfield has an area of 1.337 square miles (3.46 km^{2}), all land. It is located on the shores of Lake Arbutus, an impoundment of the Black River. The dam forming the impoundment releases water back into the river channel and a diversion channel for a hydroelectric powerhouse.

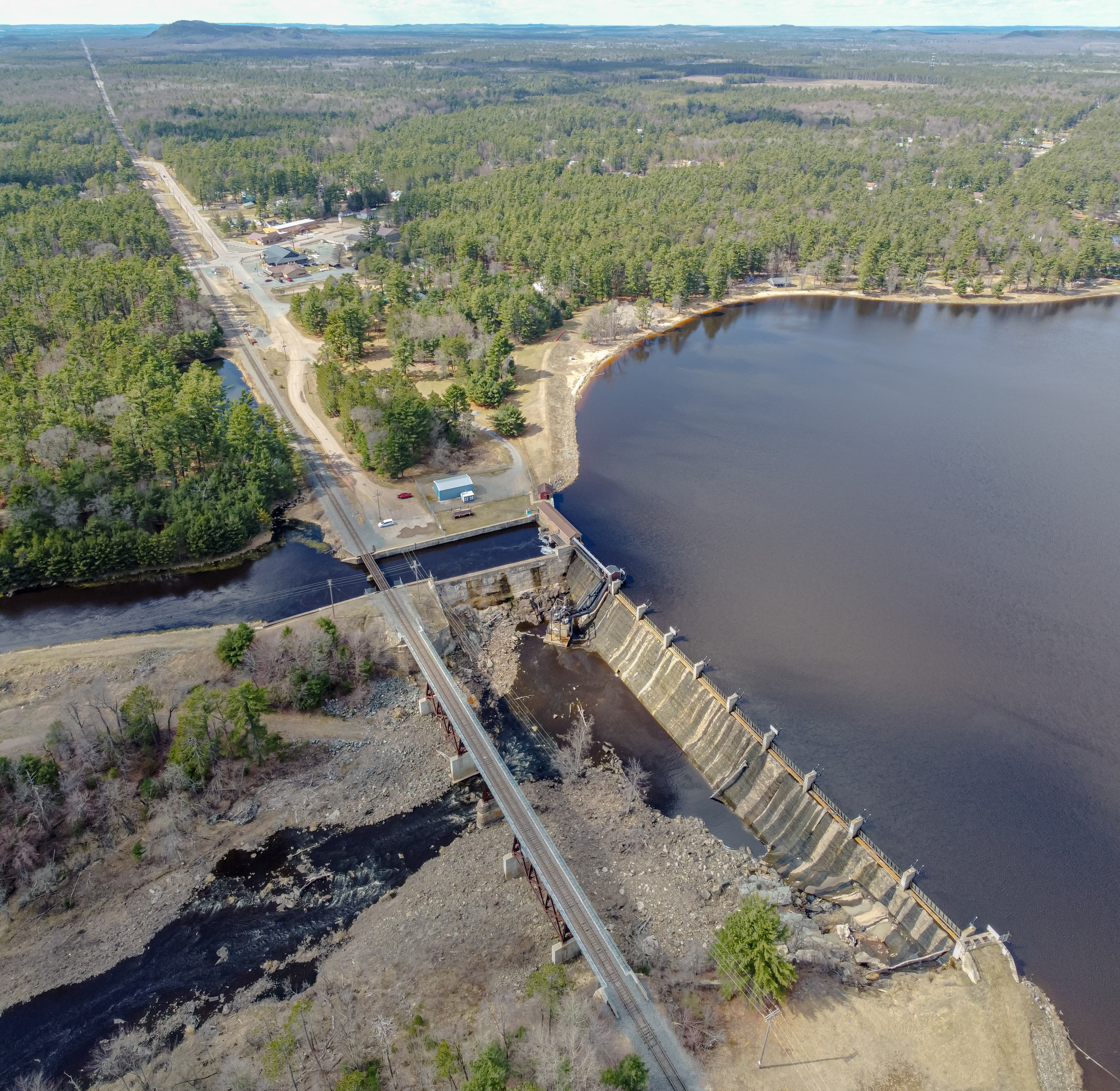
Dam near Hatfield

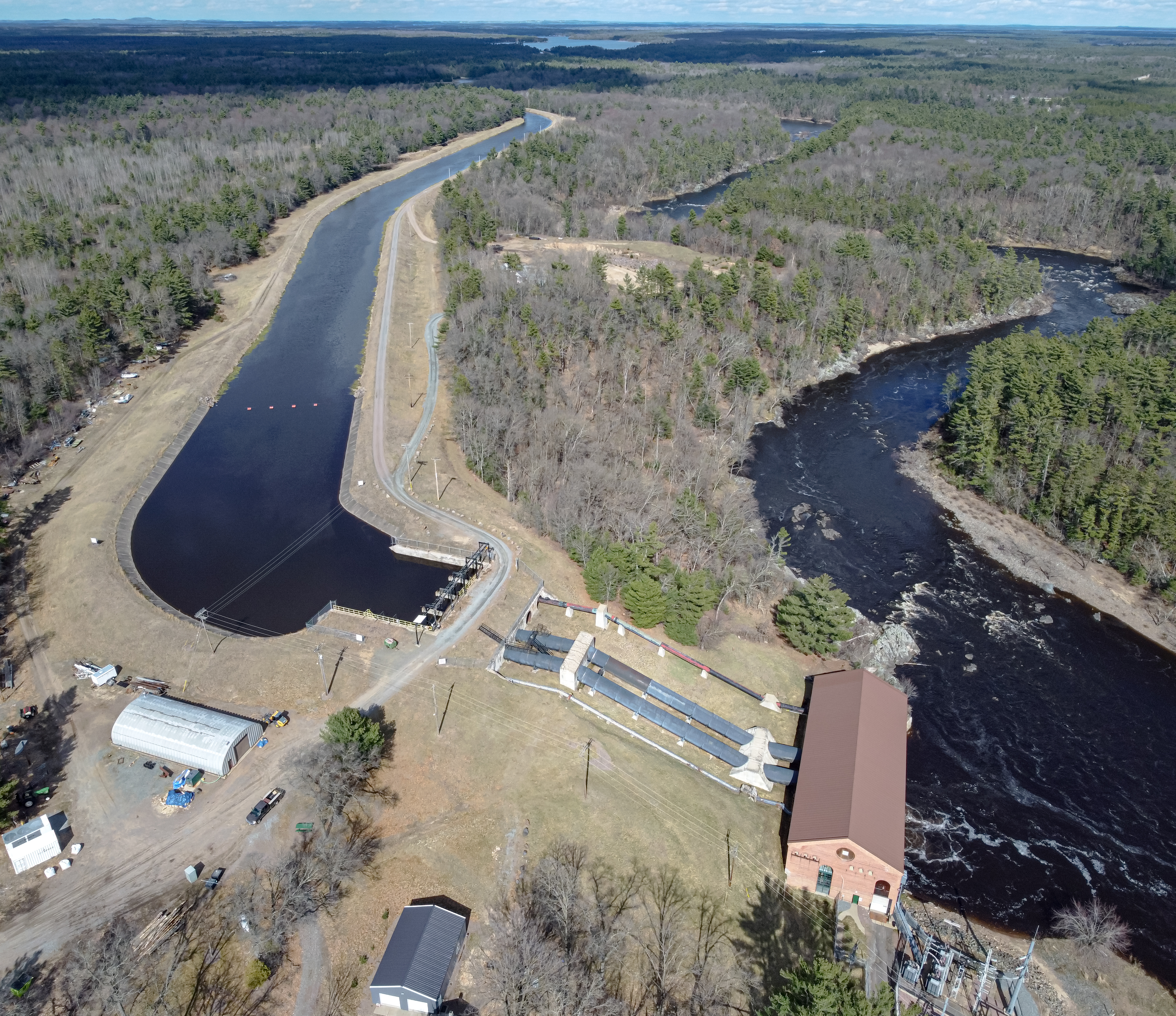
hydroelectric dam a mile down stream

== Tourism ==
Hatfield is a tourist community that claims a population of 5000 in the summer and 50 in the winter. Two county campgrounds are located in the community, and the Levis/Trow trail system is two miles to the north.

== History ==
Hatfield was founded by Norbert St. Germaine in 1836. The city was supported in the 19th century by the logging and lumber industry, as the Black River was a primary avenue for delivery of logs from central Wisconsin to the Mississippi River valley. The Green Bay and Western Railroad arrived in 1872.

== Notable people ==
- Hatfield was the birthplace of Mitchell Red Cloud, Jr. of the Ho Chunk Nation, who was awarded the Medal of Honor posthumously for his actions in the Korean War. A monument in his honor is located at the Black Hawk Powwow Grounds south of Hatfield.
