= Clay, Wisconsin =

- Ghost town
- Location within Wisconsin Location within the United States
- Coordinates: 44°23′46″N 90°40′50″W
- Country: United States
- State: Wisconsin
- County: Jackson
- Town: Komensky
- Elevation: 932 ft (284 m)
- GNIS feature ID: 2741956

Clay is a ghost town in the town of Komensky, Jackson County, Wisconsin, United States. The community is still marked on Wisconsin Department of Transportation maps.
