= Taejon Airfield =

Decommissioned air base near Taejon, South Korea

Taejon Airfield K-5 Air Base

Site information
- Type: Military airfield
- Controlled by: United States Air Force; Republic of Korea Air Force
- Condition: abandoned

Location
- Coordinates: 36°21′28.8″N 127°23′42″E

Site history
- Built: 1940s
- In use: 1940s-80s
- Battles/wars: Battle of Taejon

Taejon Airfield(대전비행장) also known as K-5 Air Base is a decommissioned United States Air Force (USAF) and Republic of Korea Air Force (ROKAF) air base northwest of the city of Taejon, South Korea. In the postwar period it was enveloped by the city of Daejeon and is now a commercial and residential area.

== History ==
=== Korean War ===
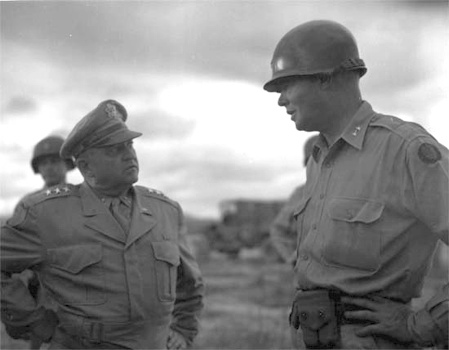
Lt Gen Walker and Maj Gen William Dean at Taejon Airfield, July 1950

On 9 July 1950, Lieutenants James A. Bryant and Frank G. Mitchell flew the first FAC missions of the Korean War from Taejon. They flew into Taejon with two L-5G Sentinels modified with VHF radios but were unable to get the radio to work. Borrowing two 24th Infantry Division L-17s, the lieutenants called down about 10 flights of F-80s on the advancing Korean People's Army (KPA) forces. The L-17s were soon replaced with T-6s equipped with AN/ARC-3 radio sets which demonstrated their value over the following days before being withdrawn to operate from Taegu.

Following their defeats at Osan, Pyongtaek and Chonan, the depleted US 24th Infantry Division established a defensive line on the Kum River, north of Taejon. On 14 July 1950, the KPA attacked the Kum River line, by 16 July had broken through the U.S. defenses and the remnants of the U.S units fell back on Taejon. The airfield was defended by the divisional artillery consolidated as a composite battalion and the 3rd Battalion, 34th Infantry Regiment. On 18 July 8th Army Commander Lieutenant General Walton Walker flew into Taejon and met with the 24th Division's commander Major General William Dean to instruct him to hold Taejon until the 1st Cavalry Division could move up from Pohang. By 19 July the KPA were attacking the outskirts of Taejon including the airfield, the attack was supported by air strikes by 6 Korean People's Air Force (KPAF) Yak-9 fighters and heavy artillery fire. The composite battalion was withdrawn to the south of Taejon city while the 3rd Battalion, 34th Infantry withdrew to the north of the city. On the night of 19/20 July KPA forces supported by tanks had surrounded Taejon city and seized the airfield and began attacking towards the center in the early morning, the remnants of the 24th Infantry Division withdrew towards Okcheon and Yeongdong on the afternoon of 20 July. The KPAF was able to make only limited use of the airfield as the UN forces had achieved air supremacy by early August 1950.

Taejon was recaptured by the 24th Infantry Division on 28 September 1950 during the UN breakout from the Pusan Perimeter following the Inchon landings.

=== Post Korean War ===
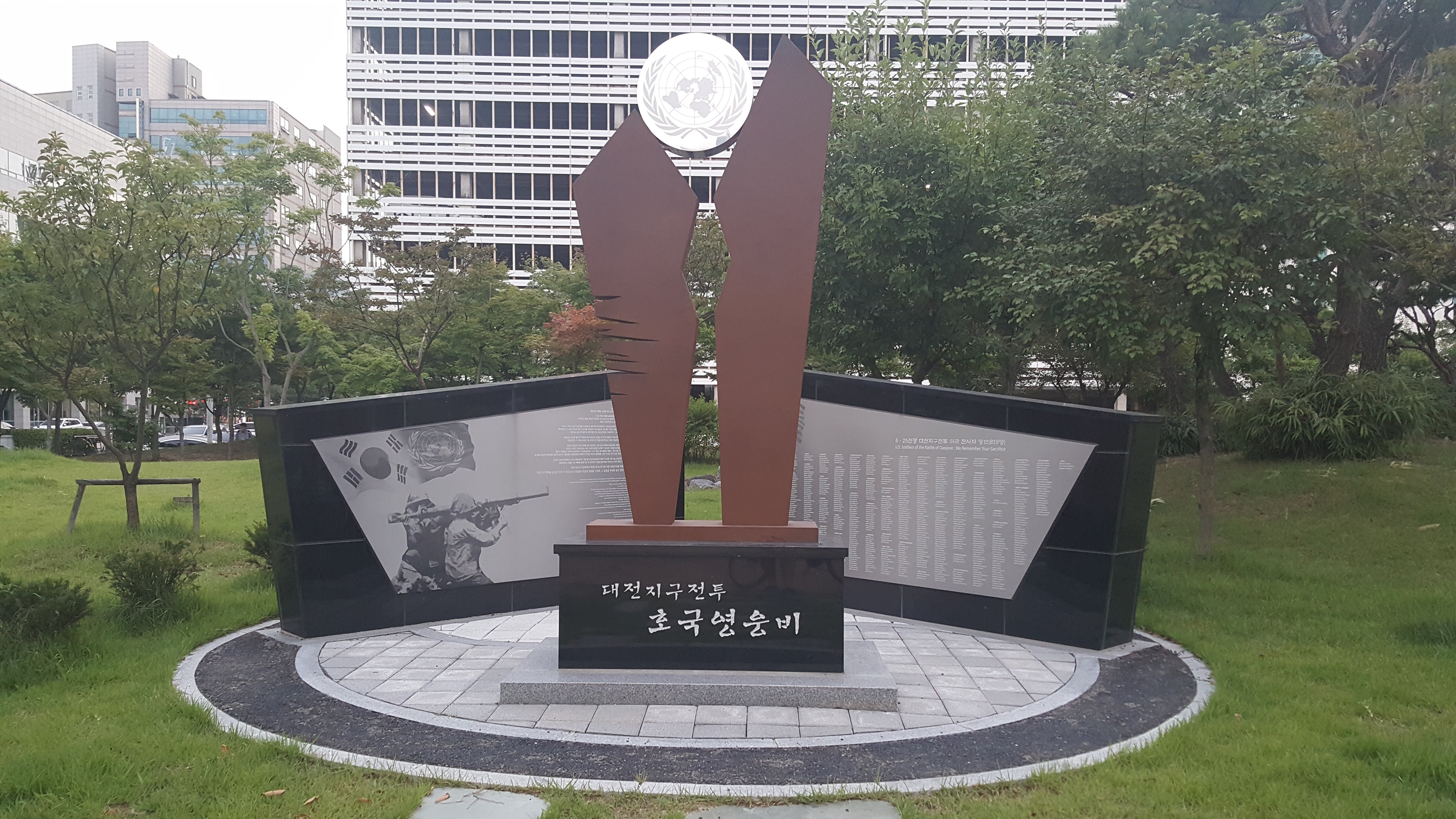
A memorial stone for the Battle of Taejon at Boramae park where the airfield was located in Daejeon, called Taejon.

In 1980s the airfield was enveloped by the city of Daejeon and it is now a commercial and residential area.
