= Winnebago Mission, Wisconsin =

Census-designated place in Wisconsin, United States

Winnebago Mission, Wisconsin Mission
- Unincorporated community
- Location within Wisconsin Location within the United States
- Coordinates: 44°20′46″N 90°45′18″W
- Country: United States
- State: Wisconsin
- County: Jackson
- Town: Komensky

Area
  - Total: 0.56 sq mi (1.44 km^{2})
- Elevation: 879 ft (268 m)
- Time zone: UTC-6 (Central (CST))
  - Summer (DST): UTC-5 (CDT)
- Area codes: 715 & 534
- GNIS feature ID: 1576873

Winnebago Mission (Hoocąk: Mišin, also known as Indian Mission) is an unincorporated community located in the town of Komensky, Jackson County, Wisconsin, United States. For the 2020 census, it was recorded as the Mission census-designated place and had a population of 297. The community is 6 miles (9.7 km) northeast of Black River Falls.
