= Komensky, Wisconsin =

- Town
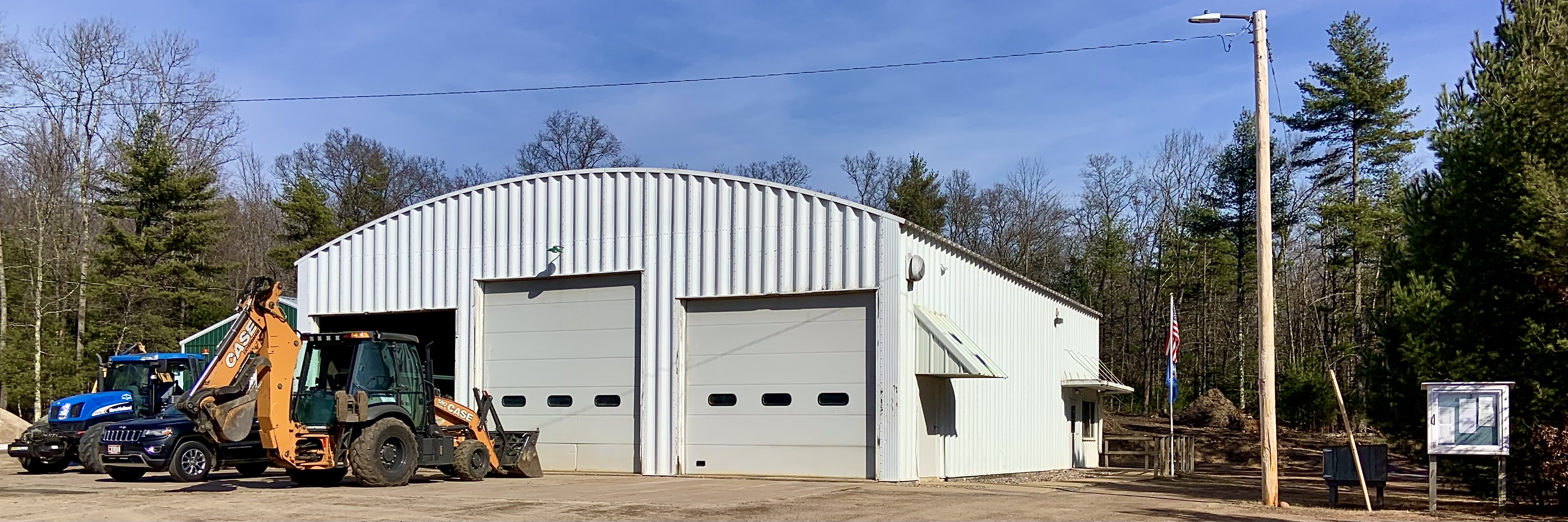
- Town hall

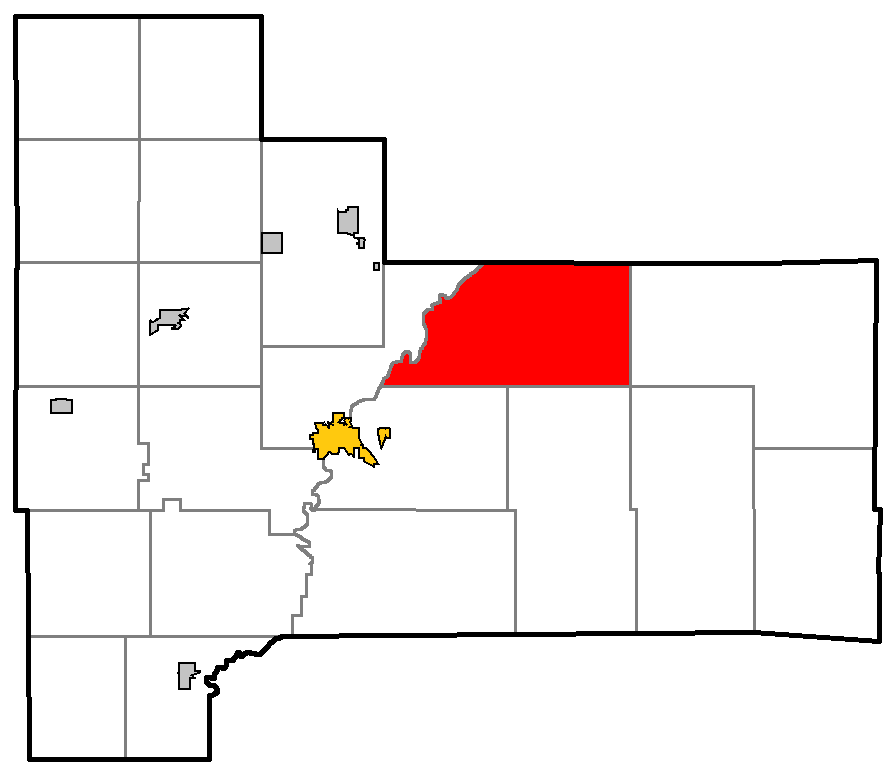
- Location of Komensky, Jackson County

- Location of Jackson County, Wisconsin
- Coordinates: 44°21′57″N 90°42′26″W
- Country: United States
- State: Wisconsin
- County: Jackson

Area
  - Total: 59.5 sq mi (154.0 km^{2})
  - Land: 58.9 sq mi (152.6 km^{2})
  - Water: 0.54 sq mi (1.4 km^{2})
- Elevation: 902 ft (275 m)

Population (2020)
  - Total: 505
  - Density: 8.57/sq mi (3.31/km^{2})
- Time zone: UTC-6 (Central (CST))
  - Summer (DST): UTC-5 (CDT)
- FIPS code: 55-40325
- GNIS feature ID: 1583493

Komensky is a town in Jackson County, Wisconsin, United States. The population was 505 at the 2020 census. The unincorporated communities of Hatfield, Waterbury, and Winnebago Mission are located in the town.

== History ==
The town was formed out of a portion of Brockway town in 1913.

The town was named after Jan Amos Komenský (1592–1670), a Czech educator and Christian leader.

The ghost town of Clay was also located in the town.

== Geography ==
According to the United States Census Bureau, the town has a total area of 59.5 square miles (154.1 km^{2}), of which 58.9 square miles (152.7 km^{2}) is land and 0.5 square mile (1.4 km^{2}) (0.91%) is water.

== Demographics ==
As of the census of 2000, there were 462 people, 108 households, and 87 families residing in the town. The population density was 7.8 people per square mile (3.0/km^{2}). There were 124 housing units at an average density of 2.1 per square mile (0.8/km^{2}). The racial makeup of the town was 20.56% White, 8.23% African American, 67.32% Native American, 1.52% from other races, and 2.38% from two or more races. Hispanic or Latino of any race were 4.33% of the population.

There were 108 households, out of which 45.4% had children under the age of 18 living with them, 38.0% were married couples living together, 28.7% had a female householder with no husband present, and 19.4% were non-families. 13.9% of all households were made up of individuals, and 3.7% had someone living alone who was 65 years of age or older. The average household size was 3.39 and the average family size was 3.72.

In the town, the population was spread out, with 33.8% under the age of 18, 20.1% from 18 to 24, 24.7% from 25 to 44, 15.4% from 45 to 64, and 6.1% who were 65 years of age or older. The median age was 23 years. For every 100 females, there were 149.7 males. For every 100 females age 18 and over, there were 175.7 males.

The median income for a household in the town was $37,188, and the median income for a family was $41,042. Males had a median income of $21,538 versus $30,313 for females. The per capita income for the town was $10,062. About 10.8% of families and 18.9% of the population were below the poverty line, including 23.7% of those under age 18 and none of those age 65 or over.

== Notable people ==
- Mitchell Red Cloud, Jr., who was awarded the Medal of Honor posthumously during the Korean War, was born in the town of Komensky, in Hatfield
