= 3rd Division (North Korea) =

Korean People's Army formation

Guards Seoul 3rd Infantry Division
- Guards badge
- Active: 1948-present
- Country: North Korea
- Allegiance: Korean People's Army
- Branch: Korean People's Army Ground Force
- Type: Infantry division
- Size: division
- Engagements: Korean War
- Decorations: Guards badge

Commanders
- Notable commanders: Major General Choi Min Chol; O Jin-u

The 3rd Infantry Division is a military formation of the Korean People's Army.

== Formation and composition ==
The exact date of its formation is in dispute, but it occurred sometime between May 1947 and October 1948, at Pyongyang. In its organization, the 3rd Division seemed to parallel the structural pattern of a typical North Korean Infantry Division. In keeping with the standard triangular organization of North Korean military formations, the 7th, 8th and 9th Rifle Regiments formed the combat nucleus of the division. Organized with a total strength of roughly 3,400 soldiers, the Division's command post was initially located at Pyongyang and was commanded by Major General Choi Min Chol.

During the early part of 1949, its divisional headquarters moved to Hamhung, where the 9th Regiment was undergoing training. By that time, the division was close to full strength, and except for incoming recruits, most of the men had completed basic training. In June 1949, those elements of the 3rd Division that were stationed at Hamhung were allegedly transferred to new locations, in a move that was designed to make room for newly organized North Korean units. Division headquarters is said to have moved to Wonsan where the artillery units and the 8th Regiment were already stationed, while the 9th Regiment moved farther south to the Kumhwa area, placing it close to the 7th Regiment located at Ch'orwon. Shortly after this move was accomplished, the division is said to have begun advanced training with units spending most of their time in the field.

== Korean War ==
During the initial attack by the North Koreans on June 25, 1950, the division was part of the I Corps. The 3rd Division was part of the North Korean advance from Seoul to Taejon. It also fought in the Battle of Pusan Perimeter.

During the U.N. breakout from the Pusan Perimeter in mid-September, the Division controlled Hills 268 and 121, along the southern approach of the Waegwan-Taegu road, one of the key positions. In many cases, the North Koreans fought to the last man, but after suffering a two-day assault by the American 1st Cavalry Division and the 5th Regimental Combat Team, including three flights of U.S. Air Force F–51 Mustang fighters dropping napalm, firing rockets, and strafing runs, they lost the hill. With the loss of these key positions, the 3rd Division's defenses around Waegwan broke apart and its troops began a panic-stricken retreat across Naktong. Aerial observers estimated that 1,500 North Koreans crossed to the west side of the Naktong just above Waegwan. Further reports indicated that the roads north of the town were jammed with North Korean soldiers in groups of 10 to 300. Furthermore, reports contend that when the remaining units of the division withdrew across the Naktong River just north of Waegwan, they sustained tremendous casualties and were practically annihilated. According to fragmentary reports, division headquarters and other elements of the 3rd Division, totaling approximately 1,800 men, succeeded in reaching Sangju, where they were ordered to retreat north. after the Korean War O Jin-u was made commander of the Infantry Division.

In 1968, it was reported to be part of the 2nd Army Group reserves, facing the western side of the DMZ.
