= David M. Smith (Medal of Honor) =

United States Army Medal of Honor recipient

David Monroe Smith
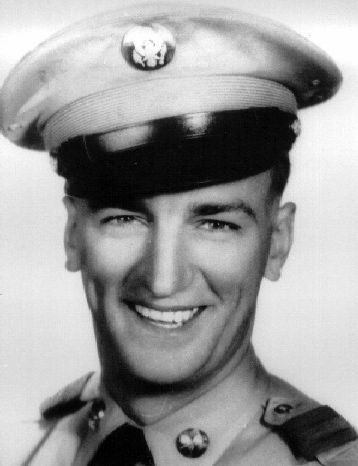
- Medal of Honor recipient
- Born: November 10, 1926; Livingston, Kentucky, US
- Died: September 1, 1950 (aged 23) near Yeongsan, Korea
- Burial place: Jake Ponder Cemetery, Livingston, Kentucky
- Military career
- Allegiance: United States
- Branch: United States Army
- Rank: Private First Class
- Units: Company E, 9th Infantry Regiment, 2nd Infantry Division
- Conflicts: Korean War †
- Awards: Medal of Honor; Purple Heart; National Defense Service Medal; Korean Service Medal; United Nations Service Medal Korea; Republic of Korea War Service Medal; Presidential Unit Citation; Republic of Korea Presidential Unit Citation; Combat Infantry Badge

David Monroe Smith (November 10, 1926 – September 1, 1950) was a soldier in the United States Army during the Korean War. He received the Medal of Honor for his actions on September 1, 1950, during the Battle of Yongsan.

== Medal of Honor citation ==
Rank and organization: Private First Class, U.S. Army, Company E, 9th Infantry Regiment, 2nd Infantry Division

Place and date: Near Yeongsan, Korea, September 1, 1950

Entered service at: Livingston, Kentucky. Born: November 10, 1926, Livingston, Kentucky.

G.O. No.: 78, August 21, 1952

Citation

Pfc. Smith, distinguished himself by conspicuous gallantry and outstanding courage above and beyond the call of duty in action. Pfc. Smith was a gunner in the mortar section of Company E, emplaced in rugged mountainous terrain and under attack by a numerically superior hostile force. Bitter fighting ensued and the enemy overran forward elements, infiltrated the perimeter, and rendered friendly positions untenable. The mortar section was ordered to withdraw, but the enemy had encircled and closed in on the position. Observing a grenade lobbed at his emplacement, Pfc. Smith shouted a warning to his comrades and, fully aware of the odds against him, flung himself upon it and smothered the explosion with his body. Although mortally wounded in this display of valor, his intrepid act saved 5 men from death or serious injury. Pfc. Smith's inspirational conduct and supreme sacrifice reflect lasting glory on himself and are in keeping with the noble traditions of the infantry of the U.S. Army.

== See also ==
- List of Medal of Honor recipients
- List of Korean War Medal of Honor recipients
