= Loren R. Kaufman =

- Born: July 27, 1923; The Dalles, Oregon, United States
- Died: February 10, 1951 (aged 27) near Yongsan, Korea
- Burial place: Willamette National Cemetery
- Military career
- Allegiance: United States
- Branch: United States Army
- Service years: 1941–1951
- Rank: Sergeant First Class
- Units: Company G, 9th Infantry Regiment, 2nd Infantry Division
- Conflicts: World War II: North African Campaign; Western Front; Korean War: Battle of Pusan Perimeter; Battle of Yongsan †
- Awards: Medal of Honor; Bronze Star Medal; Purple Heart

Loren Robert Kaufman (July 27, 1923 – February 10, 1951) was a soldier in the United States Army during the Korean War who was awarded the Medal of Honor for his actions on 4–5 September 1950 during the Battle of Yongsan. He was later killed in action before being awarded the Medal of Honor and is buried at Willamette National Cemetery.

Kaufman joined the army from his birthplace the week after the Attack on Pearl Harbor, and served in North Africa and Europe during World War II.

== Medal of Honor citation ==
Rank and organization: Sergeant First Class, U.S. Army, Company G, 9th Infantry Regiment, 2nd Infantry Division

Place and date: Near Yongsan, Korea, 4 and September 5, 1950,

Entered service at: The Dalles, Oregon. Born: July 27, 1923, The Dalles, Oregon.

G.O. No.: 61, August 2, 1951.

Citation:

Sfc. Kaufman distinguished himself by conspicuous gallantry and intrepidity above and beyond the call of duty in action. On the night of 4 September the company was in a defensive position on 2 adjoining hills. His platoon was occupying a strong point 2 miles away protecting the battalion flank. Early on 5 September the company was attacked by an enemy battalion and his platoon was ordered to reinforce the company. As his unit moved along a ridge it encountered a hostile encircling force. Sfc. Kaufman, running forward, bayoneted the lead scout and engaged the column in a rifle and grenade assault. His quick vicious attack so surprised the enemy that they retreated in confusion. When his platoon joined the company he discovered that the enemy had taken commanding ground and pinned the company down in a draw. Without hesitation Sfc. Kaufman charged the enemy lines firing his rifle and throwing grenades. During the action, he bayoneted 2 enemies and seizing an unmanned machine gun, delivered deadly fire on the defenders. Following this encounter the company regrouped and resumed the attack. Leading the assault he reached the ridge, destroyed a hostile machine gun position, and routed the remaining enemy. Pursuing the hostile troops he bayoneted 2 more and then rushed a mortar position shooting the gunners. Remnants of the enemy fled to a village and Sfc. Kaufman led a patrol into the town, dispersed them, and burned the buildings. The dauntless courage and resolute intrepid leadership of Sfc. Kaufman was directly responsible for the success of his company in regaining its positions, reflecting distinct credit upon himself and upholding the esteemed traditions of military service.

== Awards and decorations ==

Badge	Combat Infantryman Badge with star denoting 2nd award		
1st row	Medal of Honor		Bronze Star Medal
2nd row	Purple Heart	Army Good Conduct Medal with 3 Good Conduct Loops	American Campaign Medal
3rd row	European-African-Middle Eastern Campaign Medal with Arrowhead Device and 6 Campaign stars	World War II Victory Medal	National Defense Service Medal
4th row	Korean Service Medal with 4 Campaign stars	United Nations Service Medal Korea	Korean War Service Medal Retroactively Awarded, 2003
Unit Awards	Presidential Unit Citation with 1 Oak leaf cluster		Korean Presidential Unit Citation

== Legacy ==
The Veterans Administration clinic in The Dalles, Oregon is named in Kaufman's honor. The clinic provided veterans with primary care, medical laboratory services, and a range of other health care services.

== See also ==
- List of Korean War Medal of Honor recipients
