= Edward A. Craig =

United States Marine Corps general

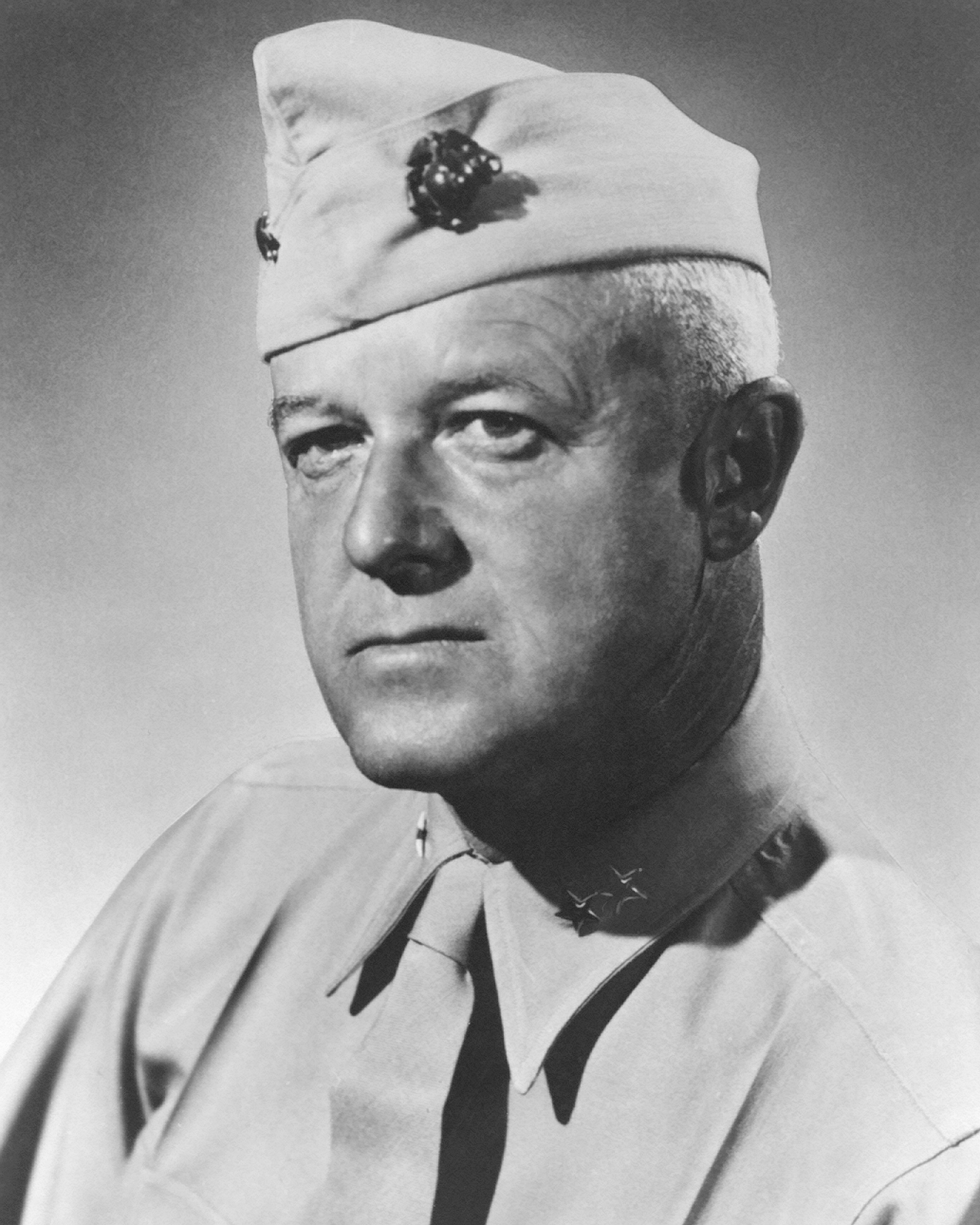
- Edward A. Craig
- Born: Edward Arthur Craig; November 22, 1896; Danbury, Connecticut, U.S.
- Died: December 11, 1994 (aged 98); El Cajon, California, U.S.
- Military career
- Allegiance: United States of America
- Branch: United States Marine Corps
- Service years: 1917–1951
- Rank: Lieutenant general
- Conflicts: World War I World War II; Korean War
- Awards: Navy Cross; Navy Distinguished Service Medal; Silver Star; Legion of Merit (2)

Edward Arthur Craig (November 22, 1896 – December 11, 1994) was a commissioned officer in the United States Marine Corps, and a decorated combat veteran of World War II and the Korean War who eventually attained the rank of lieutenant general. Craig is best known as the general who commanded the 1st Provisional Marine Brigade during its actions in the Korean War.

== Early life ==
Edward Arthur Craig was born on November 22, 1896, in Danbury, Connecticut. His father was an officer in the United States Army, so Craig, a military brat, spent much of his childhood moving around the country. His father, Charles Franklin Craig, was a U.S. Army Medical Corps Officer and Tropical Medicine professional.

Craig had his first experience with the US Marine Corps when he was 10 years old while sightseeing at the Washington Navy Yard, where he was arrested for photographing naval guns. The Marines released him after confiscating the film from his camera.

== Military career ==
=== Joining the Marines ===
He attended St. John's Military Academy in Delafield, Wisconsin, and graduated in 1917. Craig had been in the Reserve Officer's Training Corps for four years in the academy, and with the outbreak of World War I, he was offered a commission as a second lieutenant in the Marine Corps. He had originally wanted to join the US Army, but was unable to do so because the minimum age for a commission was 21, so he decided to pursue the Marines, where he could be commissioned at 20. Craig, who was living in Fort Leavenworth, Kansas, at the time, failed two eyesight tests in Chicago, Illinois, and had to personally plead to the Commandant of the Marine Corps, Major General George Barnett, for a third try. He passed his third eye exam and was commissioned on August 23, 1917. Craig later said his chief motivation to join the Marines was to fight in World War I, and he thought the failure of his eye test slowed his career considerably. He also said his father did not approve of his decision to join the Marines, thinking them "a terrible bunch of drunks and bums".

=== Occupation duties ===
Craig was trained at Marine Corps Base Quantico near Triangle, Virginia. In November 1917, Craig was assigned to duty with the 8th Marine Regiment as an adjutant to the senior staff. He continued officer training there into 1918. His unit was never dispatched to fight in World War I. Instead it was moved to Fort Crockett in Galveston, Texas, to safeguard oil fields in Tampico and other coastal areas from attack by the German Empire. The regiment stayed there for 18 months, during which it trained intensely and Craig was promoted to first lieutenant.

In April 1919, Craig was ordered to foreign shore duty in Haiti. His regiment, along with the 9th Marine Regiment sailed for Cuba and landed in Santiago, then Guantánamo Bay before landing in Port-au-Prince. The troops were made a part of the 1st Marine Brigade as part of the US contingent during the occupation of Haiti. He only stayed in Port-au-Prince for a short time, though, before being transferred to the 2nd Marine Brigade during the occupation of the Dominican Republic. He was placed in command of the 70th Company, 15th Marine Regiment, operating out of La Romana. There he spent much of his time patrolling the area for bandits and rebels. He spent eight months with the 70th Company before returning to Santo Domingo, being promoted to captain before returning to first lieutenant due to reorganization in the Marine Corps. He was then transferred to a remote outpost, Vincentillo, where he served for six months.

He returned to the United States in December 1921, returning to Quantico before heading to San Diego, hoping to join new units forming at that city's newly established base. However, the Marine Corps diverted him to Puget Sound, where there was an opening. where he served as commanding officer of the Marine detachment at the Puget Sound Naval Ammunition Depot, Washington state. Craig later said he did not enjoy this duty because of its isolation, and so requested transfer. He was ordered to foreign shore duty in 1922, on this occasion to the Olongapo Naval Station in the Philippines. Craig only stayed there briefly, though, as he was again dissatisfied with the station.

=== Inter-war period ===
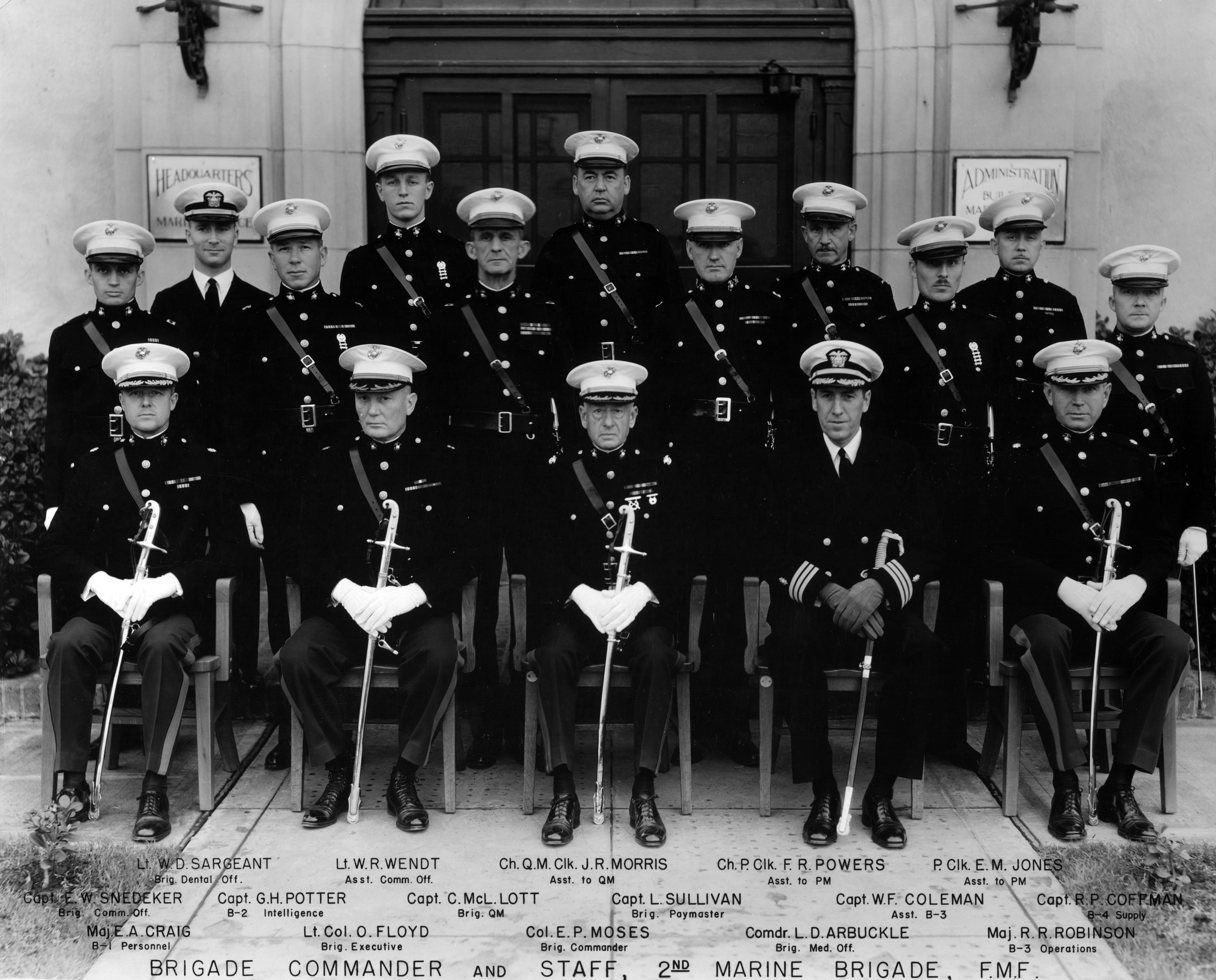
Major Craig (front row, first from left) with the staff of 2nd Marine Brigade in July 1936.

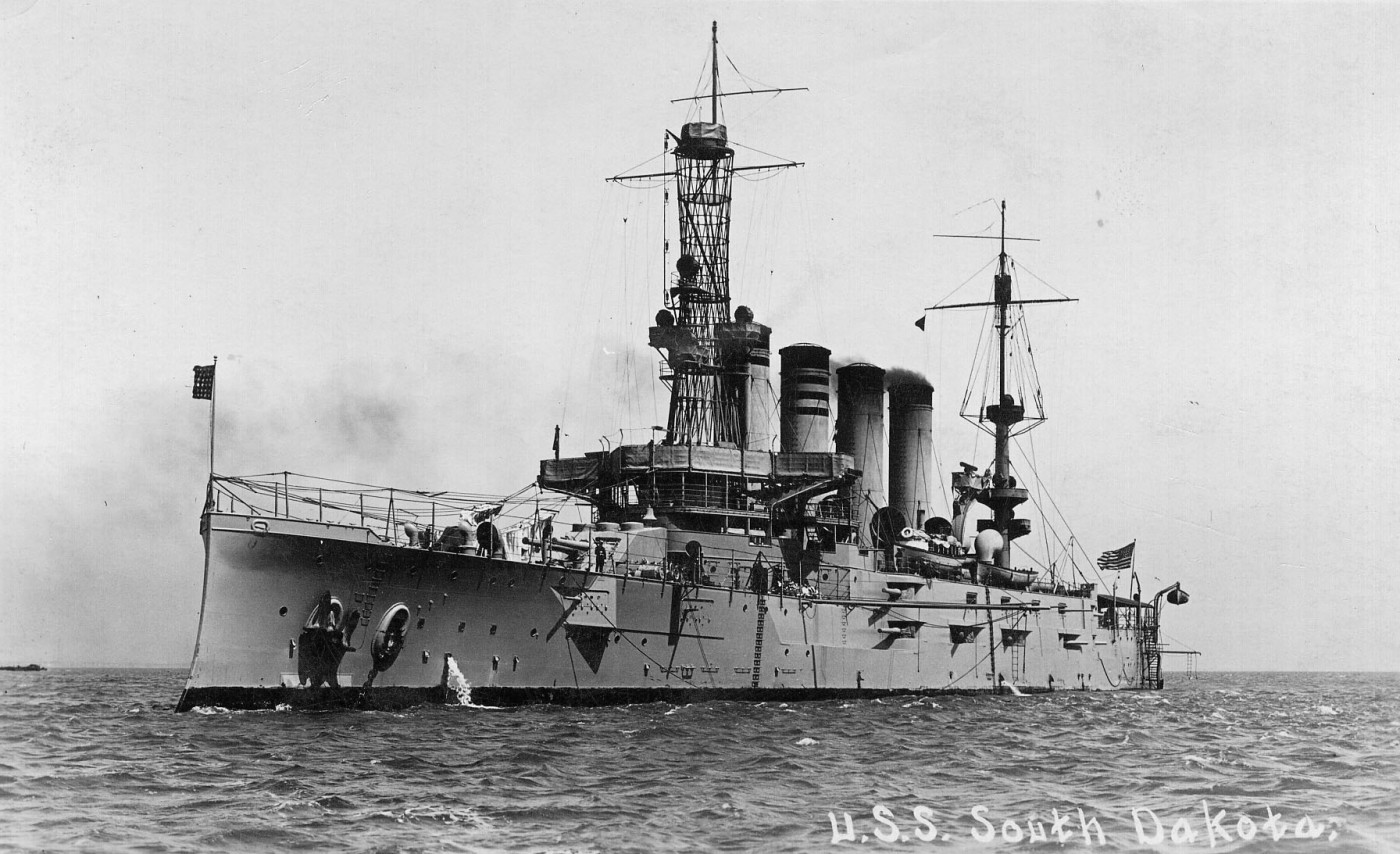
The USS Huron, where Craig spent two years as part of the Marine detachment.

In February 1924, Craig met a former commanding officer in a chance encounter and was able to trade places with an officer aboard the Pennsylvania-class cruiser USS Huron, part of the detachment of Marines on that ship. He spent the next two years aboard the ship, traveling throughout the Pacific Ocean. He later said he looked fondly on these years. During the duty, he also participated in several landings in Asia. Troops from the Huron were among an international force that landed in Shanghai, China, in 1924 to protect the Shanghai International Settlement from rival Chinese armies fighting nearby. This duty lasted a month and Craig's force never saw combat. As it was in the midst of its Warlord Era, China's scattered international interests were frequently threatened, and Craig again landed in China, and the force was sent to protect the Peking American Legation from an offensive by the warlord Wu Peifu. He remained in Peking for around a month as part of another international force before returning to the Huron.

Craig returned to the United States in March 1926, and was assigned to the 4th Marine Regiment at San Diego, California, briefly, before being assigned in June of that year as aide-de-camp to the Major General Commandant at Headquarters Marine Corps, John A. Lejeune, in Washington, D.C. This post entailed numerous inspection trips and civilian duties with the general, whom Craig later said he liked. Craig remained in this post until Lejeune's retirement in 1929.

In May 1929, Craig requested to be moved to Nicaragua for duty with the Nicaraguan National Guard. Craig was subsequently sent to serve at Jinotega as one of the staff officers for the local battalion; Craig later said this entailed numerous routine inspections of local outposts and training local troops. Near the end of 1931, Craig joined the Marine Corps Base at San Diego, California, where he remained until June 1933. During this period, he was on temporary duty in Nicaragua under the State Department from June to November 1932. Following a short interval of three months, during which Craig commanded a Marine detachment at Disciplinary Barracks, San Diego, he returned to the Marine Corps Base where he was assigned as a company commander in the 6th Marine Regiment, Fleet Marine Force. In July 1936, he was detailed as the personnel officer in the 2nd Marine Brigade under Colonel Emile P. Moses. Craig joined the Marine Corps Schools at the Marine barracks in Quantico, Virginia, in July 1937, as a student in the Senior Course. Upon graduation in May the following year, he again returned to the Marine Corps Base at San Diego, where he served as instructor in the Platoon Leaders' Course, Inspector-Instructor of Reserve Battalion Field Training, and Base Adjutant.

From June 1939 to June 1941, he was Marine officer and intelligence officer for Admiral Ernest King aboard the aircraft carriers USS Yorktown and USS Enterprise, and for an interval of four months was stationed at the Naval Air Station at Pearl Harbor. Here, Craig was often on the move with King's staff as they moved and exercised throughout the Pacific Ocean. During this time, he also served under Charles Adams Blakely and William Halsey Jr., each of whom commanded the force for a short time.

=== World War II ===
In July 1941, he again joined the Marine Base at San Diego and in October the same year was appointed provost marshal and commanding officer of the Guard Battalion at the base. These duties took on increasing importance with the outbreak of World War II, and particularity after the attack on Pearl Harbor. During Craig's tenure, the military police's presence grew substantially. Craig stayed at this post until March, 1942 when he joined the 2nd Marine Division as the commander of the 2nd Pioneer Battalion, but was quickly reassigned in June 1942 as executive officer of the 9th Marine Regiment. In this position, though, Craig only conducted maneuvers with the division, and never sailed for combat. He remained in the position until October, when he became commanding officer, Service Troops, 3rd Marine Division, and was promoted to colonel.

Craig sailed with the division for the South Pacific in February 1943. He arrived in New Zealand with the division, commanding the service troops in training and maneuvers there, Craig requested to return to an infantry unit and in July of that year was made commander of the 9th Marines, replacing Lemuel C. Shepherd, who had been promoted. Craig was subsequently transferred to Guadalcanal with those Marines. Commanding the 9th Marines during the landings at Bougainville Island in November 1943, Craig led his troops through Bougainville Campaign for months as they fought Japanese forces on the island. Craig's troops remained on the island until April 1944, when they were pulled back to Guadalcanal to prepare for another operation. For his leadership during the campaign, Craig was awarded the Bronze Star Medal.

Remaining as commanding officer of the regiment, he took part in the invasion and subsequent recapture of Guam, Marianas Islands, in July and August 1944. He was ordered to the V Amphibious Corps in September 1944, where he became Corps Operations Officer, in which capacity he planned and participated in the landing and assault on Iwo Jima in February 1945. For his participation in the fighting on Guam, he received the Navy Cross, and while serving as operations officer, V Amphibious Corps, he was awarded the Legion of Merit for outstanding services during the bitter campaign on Iwo Jima.

He returned to the United States in July 1945, and assumed duties as chief of staff of the Marine Training Command, San Diego Area.

=== Post-World War II ===
From October 1945 to July 1946, he served as commanding officer of the Redistribution Regiment of the Marine Training and Replacement Command, San Diego Area.

After six months as Chief Instructor of the Troop Training Unit, Amphibious Forces, Pacific Fleet, during which time he was in charge of the Specialized Amphibious Training of Eighth Army Troops in Japan, he was promoted to brigadier general and again ordered overseas as assistant division commander, 1st Marine Division (Reinforced), Tientsin, China. On 1 June 1947 he was assigned as commanding general, 1st Provisional Marine Brigade, Fleet Marine Force on Guam, where he remained for two years.

=== Korean War ===
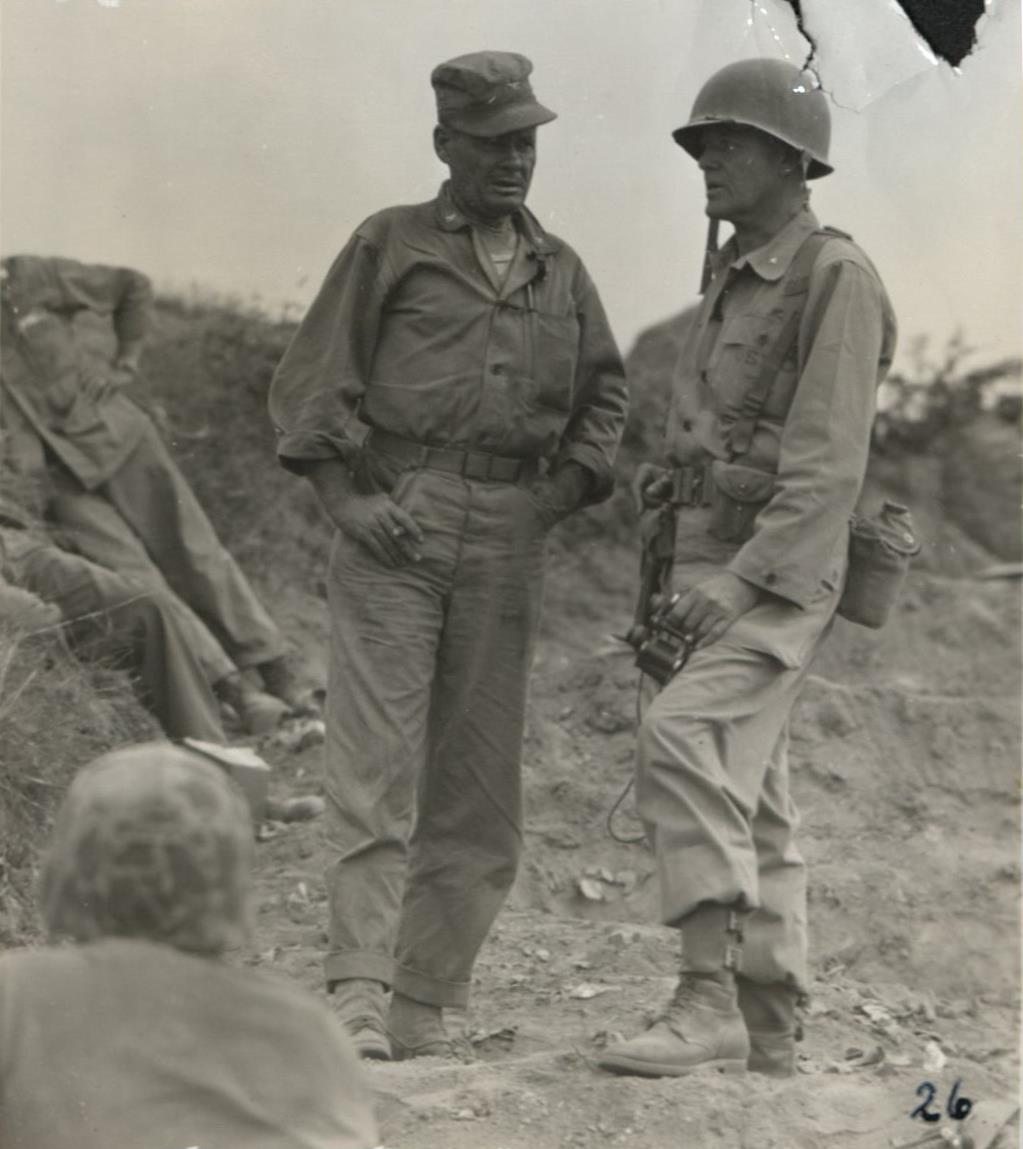
General Craig (right) in conversation with Colonel Chesty Puller in Korea, September 25, 1950.

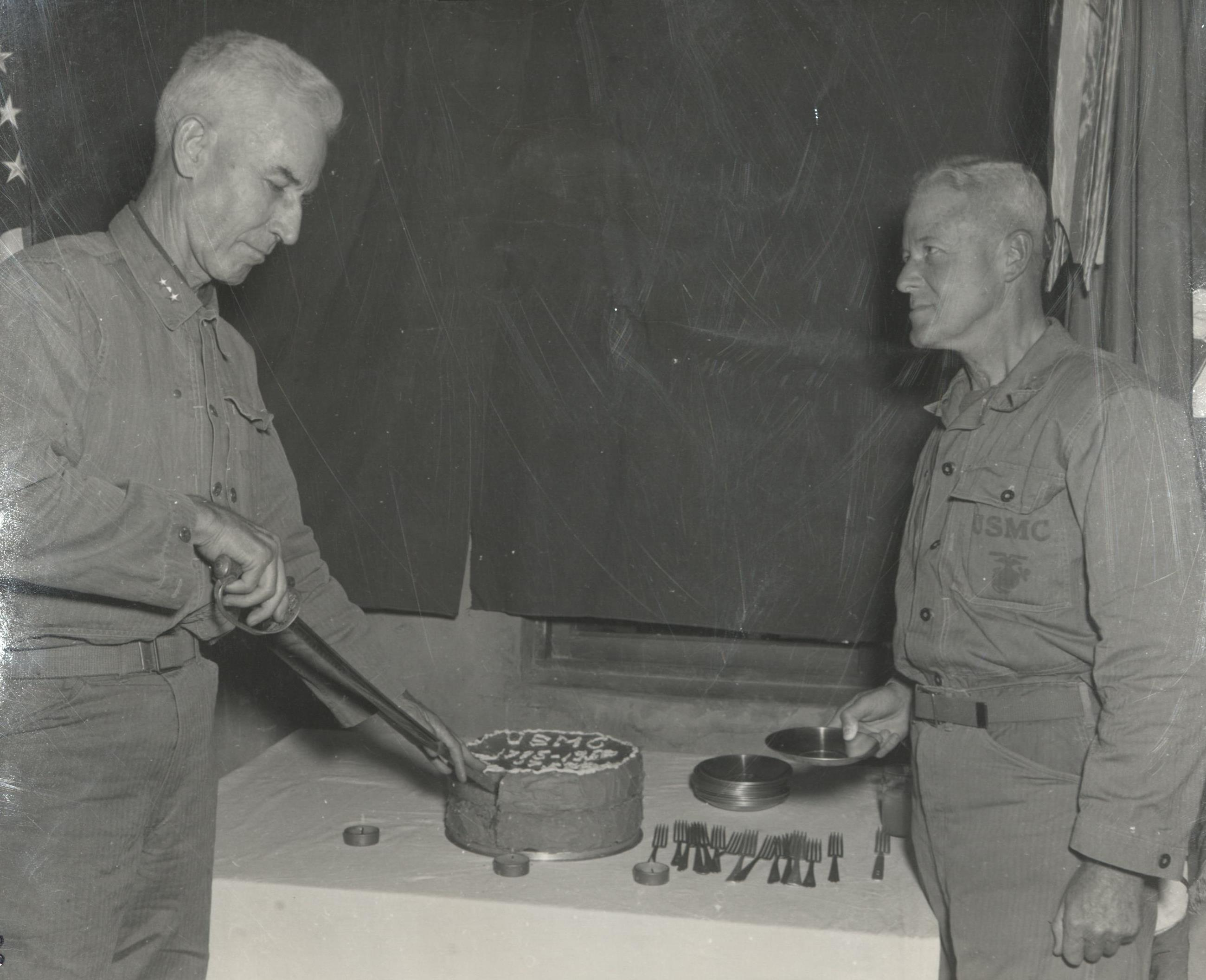
Marine Corps Birthday Celebration on November 10, 1950. Craig (right) with General Oliver P. Smith, Commander of 1st Marine Division near Hungnam, Korea.

The U.S. Marine Corps, which had been drastically reduced in size after World War II, was unprepared for another war at the outset of the Korean War on June 25, 1950. The United States military Joint Chiefs of Staff ordered the Marine Corps to ready a 15,000-man division into Korea as a part of the United Nations Command being created there. The Marine Corps began rebuilding the 1st Marine Division to wartime strength, but in the meantime assembled a 4,725-man force around the 5th Marine Regiment to assist in the war effort as quickly as possible. On July 7, the 1st Provisional Marine Brigade was reactivated in California. One week later, it sailed from Long Beach and San Diego. The regiment, which had originally been slated for landing in Japan, bypassed that country and landed at Pusan in South Korea on August 3. It was put under command of Craig. The brigade was supported by Marine Aircraft Group 33. It became a subordinate unit of the Eighth United States Army under Lieutenant General Walton Walker, who placed it in his reserve.

When the 1st Provisional Marine Brigade subsequently arrived in Korea, Craig once again became assistant division commander and took part in the landing at Inchon and operations in northeast Korea. The brigade took part in the Battle of Masan, the First and Second Battle of Naktong Bulge and the Battle of Yongsan during 1950. He was appointed to his present rank in January 1951. In March 1951, he returned to the United States, and assumed duties at Marine Corps Headquarters as director of the Marine Corps Reserve.

While commanding the 1st Provisional Marine Brigade, he was awarded the Distinguished Service Medal, Silver Star Medal, and the Air Medal with Gold Star in lieu of a second award.

=== Later life ===
Lieutenant General Edward A. Craig served as director of the Marine Corps Reserve prior to his retirement on 1 June 1951, after more than thirty-three years of Marine Corps service.

He died on 11 December 1994 at his home in El Cajon, California, at the age of 98.

== Awards and decorations ==
Craig's awards and decorations include:

1st Row	Navy Cross		Navy Distinguished Service Medal	Silver Star Medal
2nd Row	Legion of Merit with "V" Device	Bronze Star Medal with "V" Device	Air Medal with service star	U.S. Navy Presidential Unit Citation with three stars
3rd Row	Navy Unit Commendation	World War I Victory Medal with Transport Clasp	Haitian Campaign Medal	Marine Corps Expeditionary Medal with award star
4th Row	2nd Nicaraguan Campaign Medal	American Defense Service Medal with Fleet Clasp	American Campaign Medal	Asiatic-Pacific Campaign Medal with silver campaign star
5th Row	World War II Victory Medal	Navy Occupation Service Medal	China Service Medal	National Defense Service Medal
6th Row	Korean Service Medal with four campaign stars	Republic of Korea Presidential Unit Citation with two bronze oak leaves	United Nations Service Medal for Korea	Korean War Service Medal (Note: In 2000 this award was made retroactive to all US military who served in the Korean War.) with four bronze campaign stars

=== Navy Cross citation ===
Citation:

The President of the United States of America takes pleasure in presenting the Navy Cross to Colonel Edward A. Craig (MCSN: 0-196), United States Marine Corps, for extraordinary heroism as Commanding Officer of the Ninth Marines, THIRD Marine Division, during action against enemy Japanese forces on Guam, Marianas Islands, from 21 July to 10 August 1944. An Aggressive and inspiring leader, Colonel Craig constantly directed his men in combat in the face of intense enemy fire from the time of landing with the assault elements of his regiment until organized resistance ceased. On 30 July, charged with capturing a portion of high ground on the force beachhead line and making contact with the Army on Mount Tenjo, Colonel Craig remained with his leading assault elements during the entire advance and, by his coolness under fire, provided inspiration for his officers and men. Personally directing the final assault on Mount Chachao, he kept casualties at a minimum by his expert judgment. When of his battalions encountered heavy enemy resistance near an important road junction during the advance to the northern end of Guam on 3 August, he took a position beside a tank advancing with the assault troops and, despite a constant stream of rifle and machine-gun fire, fearlessly remained there throughout the entire action of several hours to direct the attack which annihilated several hundred of the enemy. His outstanding ability, courageous leadership and devotion to duty were important factors in the success of the campaign and reflect the highest credit upon Colonel Craig and the United States Naval Service.

=== Silver Star citation ===
Citation:

The President of the United States of America, authorized by Act of Congress July 9, 1918, takes pleasure in presenting the Silver Star (Army Award) to Brigadier General Edward A. Craig (MCSN: 0-196), United States Marine Corps, for conspicuous gallantry and intrepidity in action as Assistant Division Commander, FIRST Marine Division (Reinforced), in the amphibious landing resulting in the capture of Inchon, Korea, on 15 September 1950 in the Inchon-Seoul operation. His actions contributed materially to the success of this operation and were in keeping with the highest traditions of the military service.

== Citations ==
=== Sources ===
- Alexander, Bevin (2003), Korea: The First War We Lost, New York, New York: Hippocrene Books, ISBN 978-0-7818-1019-7
- Appleman, Roy E. (1998), South to the Naktong, North to the Yalu: United States Army in the Korean War, Washington, D.C.: Department of the Army, ISBN 978-0-16-001918-0, archived from the original on 2014-02-07
- Camp, Dick (2022), Lieutenant General Edward A. Craig: Warrior Six: Combat Leader in World War II and Korea, Havertown, Pennsylvania: Casemate Publishers, ISBN 978-1-63624-236-1
- Catchpole, Brian (2001), The Korean War, London, United Kingdom: Robinson Publishing, ISBN 978-1-84119-413-4
- Ecker, Richard E. (2004), Battles of the Korean War: A Chronology, with Unit-by-Unit United States Casualty Figures & Medal of Honor Citations, Jefferson, North Carolina: McFarland & Company, ISBN 978-0-7864-1980-7
- Fehrenbach, T.R. (2001) [1994], This Kind of War: The Classic Korean War History – Fiftieth Anniversary Edition, Washington, D. C.: Potomac Books Inc., ISBN 978-1-57488-334-3
- Gugeler, Russell A. (2005), Combat Actions in Korea, Honolulu, Hawaii: University Press of the Pacific, ISBN 978-1-4102-2451-4
- Millett, Allan R. (2000), The Korean War, Volume 1, Lincoln, Nebraska: University of Nebraska Press, ISBN 978-0-8032-7794-6
- Tatem, L. E. (1968), Oral History: LTG Edward A. Craig (Ret.), Washington, D.C.: US Marine Corps
