= Lee Kwon-mu =

North Korean general (1914–1986)

Lee Kwon Mu 리권무
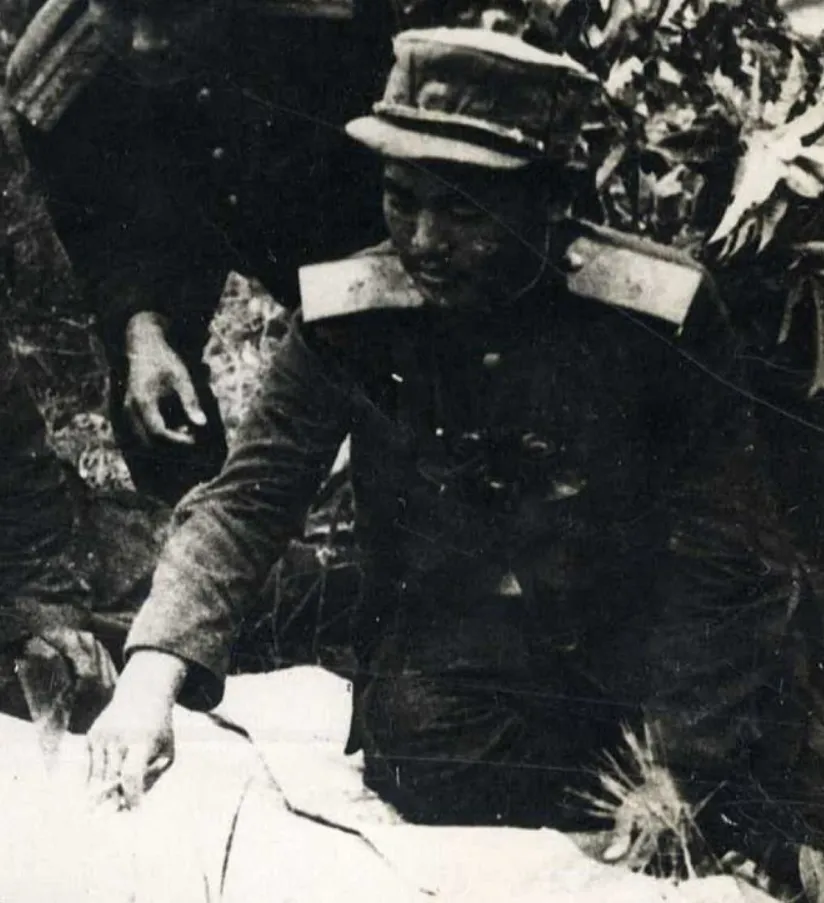
- Born: 1914; Manchuria, Republic of China
- Died: 1986 (aged 71–72)
- Allegiance: China; North Korea
- Branch: Eighth Route Army; Korean People's Army Ground Force
- Service years: (North Korea) 1948–1959
- Rank: Lieutenant General
- Commands: NK 4th Division; NK I Corps
- Conflicts: See battles: Second Sino-Japanese War; Chinese Civil War; Korean War; Battle of Uijeongbu; Battle of Dongducheon; Battle of Pocheon; Battle of changdong; Battle of miari; Battle of Sinsa-dong and Gwacheon; Battle Siheung-Anyang-Suwon; Battle of Osan; Battle of Pyongtaek; Battle of Chonan; Battle of before; Battle of Chochiwon; Battle of Taejon; Battle of Geochang; Battle of Hadong; Battle of Pusan Perimeter; First Battle of Naktong Bulge; Second Battle of Naktong Bulge; Battle of Ponam Hill 328; Third Battle of Seoul; Battle of Yongsan
- Awards: Hero of the Republic; Order of the National Flag, First Class

- Lee Kwon Mu
- Hangul: 리권무
- Hanja: 李權武
- RR: Ri Gwonmu
- MR: Ri Kwŏnmu

South Korean spelling
- Hangul: 이권무
- RR: I Gwonmu
- MR: I Kwŏnmu

Lee Kwon-mu (Korean: 리권무; 1914–1986), also known as Yi Kwon-mu or Ri Gwon-mu, was a North Korean general officer during the Korean War. He commanded a division, and later a corps, on the front line of the conflict and received North Korea's two highest military honours, the Hero of the Republic and the Order of the National Flag, First Class.

== Biography ==
Lee was born in Manchuria in 1914 to two Korean refugees. He joined the Chinese Communist Eighth Route Army, fighting both the Chinese Nationalists and the Imperial Japanese Army. Some reports indicate he was also a Lieutenant in the Soviet Red Army during World War II and a personal friend of Kim Il Sung. In 1948, Lee attended a military officer school in the Soviet Union. Upon returning to North Korea, he was appointed chief of staff of the Korean People's Army (KPA).

=== Korean War ===
Prior to the Korean War, Lee was recalled on personal order of the North Korean Premier Kim Il Sung. Kim personally gave Lee command of the newly formed 4th Division of the Korean People's Army Ground Force. As such he was made a Sojang, or Major General, in the Korean military.

On June 22, 1950, Lee issued his operational order to the NK 4th Division, stating it, along with the NK 1st Division and NK 3rd Division would attack Seoul before moving further down the Uijongbu corridor. Preparations for this order were completed by midnight of June 23.

On June 25, 1950, Lee subsequently led his division to the capture of Seoul in the First Battle of Seoul. He was awarded his decorations for this action. After Seoul, Lee was leading his division south when it encountered forces of Task Force Smith at Osan, defeating the US Army in its first engagement in Korea, the Battle of Osan on July 5. Lee's division went on to fight the US forces back further at the Battle of Pyongtaek, Battle of Chonan, the Battle of Chochiwon and the Battle of Uijeongbu. At the Battle of Taejon from July 12–20, Lee's division was pivotal in routing and defeating the US 24th Infantry Division, a feat for which it was upgraded to the status of a guards unit. Lee also received the Hero of the Chosun Minjujui Inmun Kongwhakuk (Hero of the Democratic People's Republic of North Korea) and the Order of the National Flag, First Class for his accomplishments.

Immediately thereafter, Lee's division advanced to the Pusan Perimeter, where the United Nations had established defensive positions around the port city of Pusan. Lee's division confronted the US 24th Infantry Division along the Naktong River from August 5–19, the First Battle of Naktong Bulge. His division, originally numbering 7,000, was reduced to 3,500 in this fight. It was defeated and forced back across the river to rebuild.

After the defeat of the North Korean forces at the Pusan Perimeter, Lee was promoted to Lieutenant General and relieved Kim Ung as the commander of the NK I Corps. Under his command, the NK I Corps participated in the Chinese Third, Fourth and Fifth Phase Offensive in 1951.

=== Later life ===
After the war, Lee resumed his position as the chief of staff of the KPA. By 1959, however, Kim Il Sung systematically purged all rivals within the Soviet and Chinese factions of the KPA, and Lee was removed from his position. He disappeared from public life soon after his removal.

== Notes ==
Military offices
Preceded by Kim Kwang-hyop	Chief of the General Staff of the Korean People's Army; September 1957-July 1959	Succeeded by Kim Chang-bong
