= Charles W. Turner (Medal of Honor) =

United States Army Medal of Honor recipient

Charles William Turner
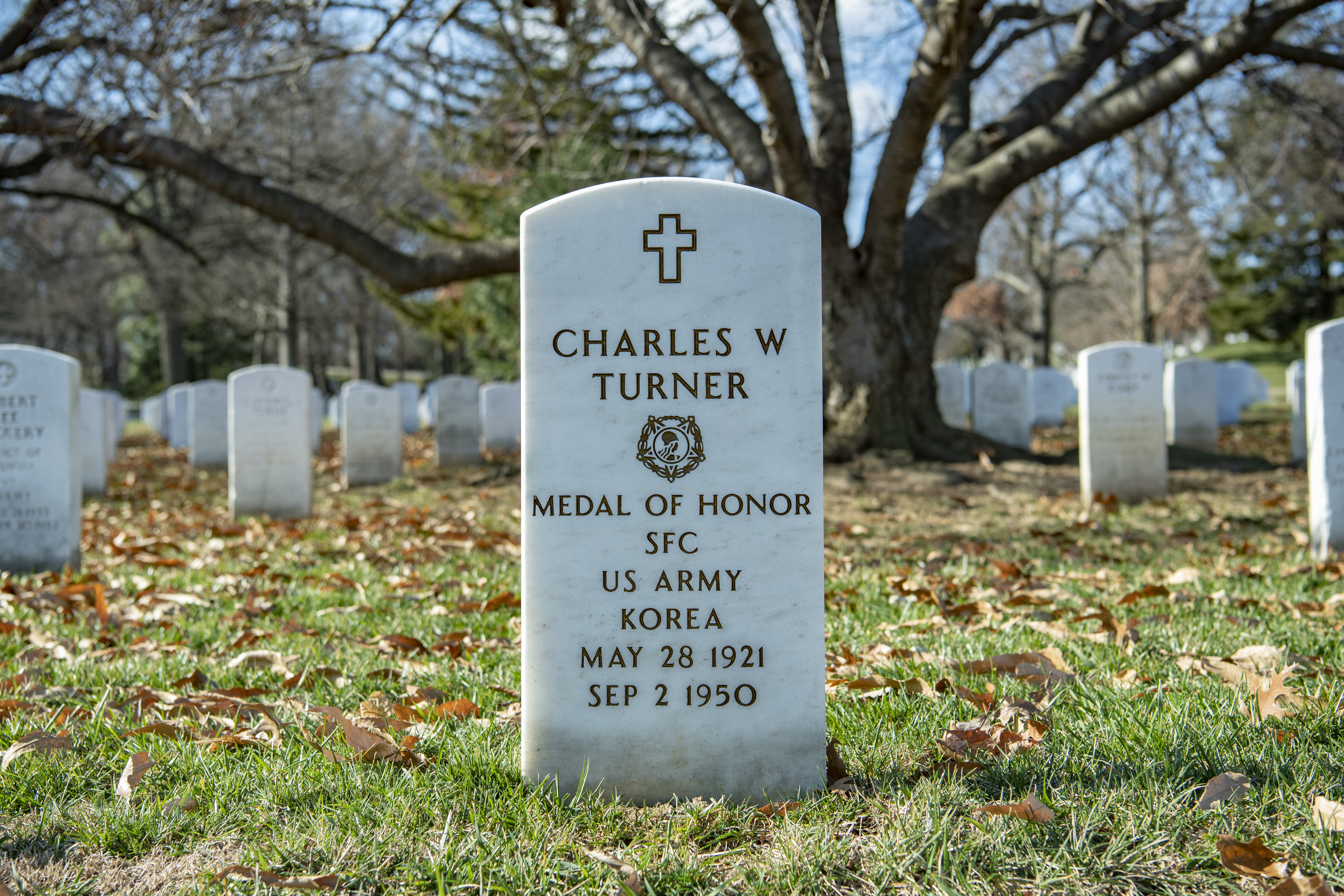
- Grave at Arlington National Cemetery
- Born: May 28, 1921; Boston, Massachusetts, US
- Died: September 2, 1950 (aged 29); Near Yeongsan, Korea
- Burial place: Arlington National Cemetery
- Military career
- Allegiance: United States
- Branch: United States Army
- Service years: 1941–1950
- Rank: Sergeant First Class
- Units: 2nd Reconnaissance Company, 2nd Infantry Division
- Conflicts: World War II; Korean War †
- Awards: Medal of Honor; Purple Heart; Army Good Conduct Medal; National Defense Service Medal; United Nations Korea Medal; Korean War Service Medal

Charles William Turner (May 28, 1921 – September 2, 1950) was a United States Army soldier and a recipient of the United States military's highest decoration, the Medal of Honor, for his actions during the Battle of Yongsan in the Korean War. He was posthumously awarded the Medal of Honor for his actions on September 1, 1950.

Turner initially joined the Massachusetts National Guard, and was called to active duty in 1941 to serve in World War II. He was captured while serving in Italy in November 1943, and spent the remainder of the conflict as a prisoner of war.

== Medal of Honor citation ==
Rank and organization: Sergeant First Class, U.S. Army, 2nd Reconnaissance Company, 2nd Infantry Division

Place and date: Near Yeongsan, Korea, September 1, 1950

Entered service at: Massachusetts. Birth: Boston, Massachusetts

G.O. No.: 10, February 16, 1951

Citation:

Sfc. Turner distinguished himself by conspicuous gallantry and intrepidity above and beyond the call of duty in action against the enemy. A large enemy force launched a mortar and automatic weapon supported assault against his platoon. Sfc. Turner, a section leader, quickly organized his unit for defense and then observed that the attack was directed at the tank section 100 yards away. Leaving his secured section he dashed through a hail of fire to the threatened position and, mounting a tank, manned the exposed turret machine gun. Disregarding the intense enemy fire he calmly held this position delivering deadly accurate fire and pointing out targets for the tank's 75mm. gun. His action resulted in the destruction of 7 enemy machine gun nests. Although severely wounded he remained at the gun shouting encouragement to his comrades. During the action the tank received over 50 direct hits; the periscopes and antenna were shot away and 3 rounds hit the machine gun mount. Despite this fire he remained at his post until a burst of enemy fire cost him his life. This intrepid and heroic performance enabled the platoon to withdraw and later launch an attack which routed the enemy. Sfc. Turner's valor and example reflect the highest credit upon himself and are in keeping with the esteemed traditions of the U.S. Army.

== See also ==
- List of Medal of Honor recipients
- List of Korean War Medal of Honor recipients
