= Battle of Uijeongbu (1950) =

Battle of the Korean war

- Part of Korean War
Date	June 25–26, 1950
Location	Uijeongbu
Result	North Korean victory

Belligerents
South Korea	North Korea

Units involved
7th Infantry Division; 2nd Infantry Division	3rd Infantry Division; 4th Infantry Division; 105th Tank Brigade

The Battle of Uijeongbu was fought in Uijeongbu during the Korean War from 25 to 26 June 1950, during the North Korean invasion of South Korea.

== North Korean offensive ==
The objectives of the North Koreans' offensive was divided into three lines. The aim of the first one was to pass Gaeseong, Munsan and Seoul. The second was to pass Uijeongbu and Seoul and the goal of the third was to pass Chuncheon. Of these three lines, the Chuncheon advance was halted, but the Gaeseong-Munsan line, after a 1-day delay, broke through and the Uijeongbu line broke through easily.

The Korean People's Army (KPA) force comprised the 3rd and 4th Infantry Divisions led by Lee kwon mu reinforced by the 105th Tank Brigade and was opposed by the Republic of Korea Army (ROK) 7th Infantry Division.

The ROK 7th Division was pushed from the front line, and established a defence line linking Pocheon and Dongducheon. This couldn't hold, and the division was pushed backed to Uijeongbu. Chae Byeong-deok, the Chief of Staff of the South Korean Defence Corps, added the 2nd Infantry Division and other men, but the next day the KPA pushed into Uijeongbu.

As a last resort, the South Koreans established another defence line at Gangbuk-gu, but were defeated at the Battle of Miari. After three days of resistance, the KPA drove into Seoul.
