= 2023 Kentucky train derailment =

Train accident in America

Coordinates: 37.300°N 84.215°W

The 2023 Kentucky train derailment occurred on the afternoon of November 22, 2023, at approximately 2:23 PM ET, a CSX mixed freight train derailed in Rockcastle County, Kentucky, causing a major spill of molten sulfur chemicals near Roundstone Creek, a creek located northwest of Livingston. Only one member of the CSX train's two-person crew was treated at the scene for minor injuries. The incident occurred six days after a similar CSX derailment that happened in Atlanta, Georgia.

== Background ==
The derailment occurred in the backdrop of an "alarming" number of derailments in 2023 in the United States.

Shortly after the derailment, the town of Livingston was evacuated. The governor of Kentucky declared a state of emergency in the entire surroundings of Rockcastle County in connection of the derailment and the chemicals, but was lifted several hours later.

A total of 15 out of the 40 cars of the train derailed, and at least only two were breached. The train spilled burning molten sulfur chemicals that created a large plumes of smoke. The derailment occurred near both Roundstone Creek and Ten Foot Hole Road, which is part of the Roundstone watershed. The chemicals released were suspected to include sulfur dioxide, which is harmful in high concentrations and as a background pollutant.

== Reaction ==
In reaction to the derailment, the Chinese government launched a disinformation campaign on social media alleging a cover-up.
