= First Battle of Naktong Bulge =

Battle of the Korean War during the Battle of Pusan Perimeter

First Battle of Nakdong Bulge
- Part of the Battle of Pusan Perimeter
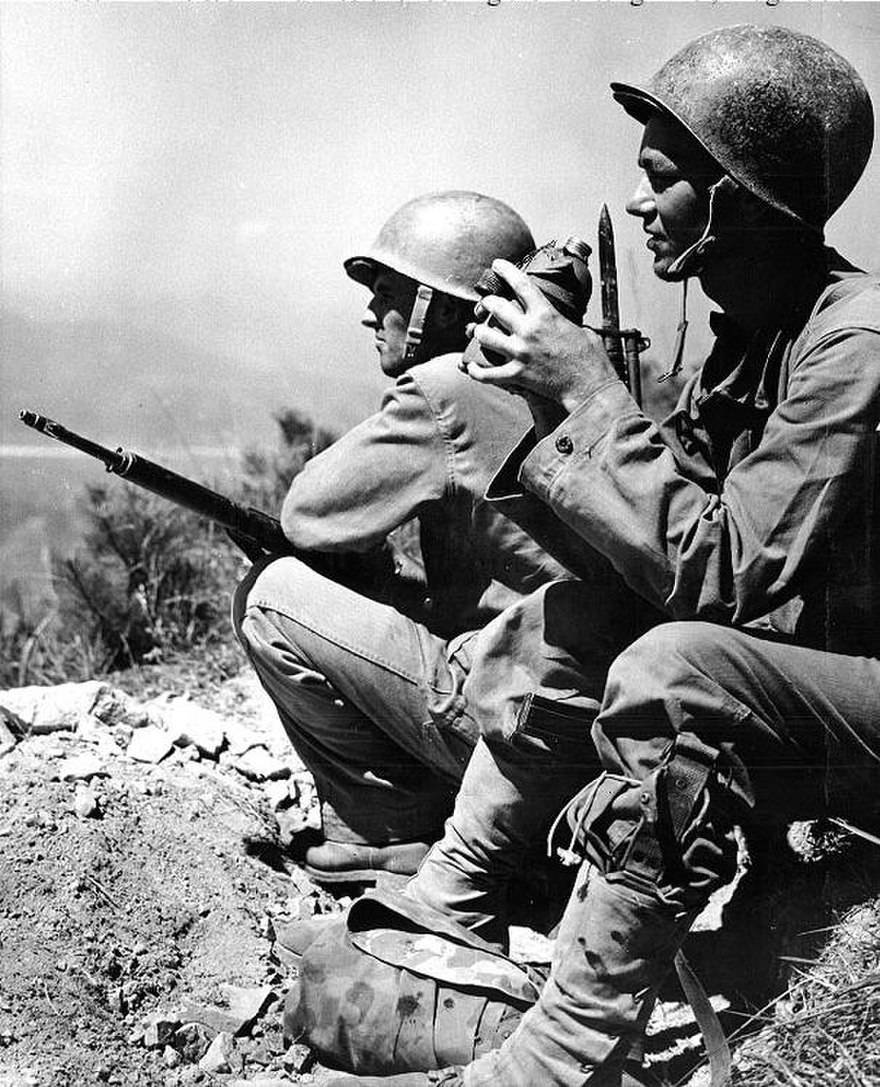
- US Marines resting on a newly captured position overlooking the Naktong River, August 19, 1950.
Date	August 5–19, 1950
Location	Yeongsan, Changnyeong, South Korea
Result	United Nations victory

Belligerents
United Nations: United States	North Korea

Commanders and leaders
(United States) John H. Church	(North Korea) Lee Kwon Mu

Units involved
24th Infantry Division; 1st Provisional Marine Brigade	4th Division

Strength
20,000+	7,000

Casualties and losses
600 killed 1,200 wounded or captured	1,200 killed 2,300 wounded, captured, and deserted

The First Battle of Naktong Bulge was an engagement between United Nations Command (UN) and North Korean forces early in the Korean War from August 5–19, 1950 in the vicinity of Yongsan (Yeongsan, Changnyeong county) and the Naktong River in South Korea. It was a part of the Battle of Pusan Perimeter, and was one of several large engagements fought simultaneously. The battle ended in a victory for the UN after large numbers of US reinforcements destroyed an attacking North Korean division.

On August 5, the Korean People's Army (KPA), 4th Infantry Division crossed the Naktong River in the vicinity of Yongsan, attempting to cut UN supply lines to the north as well as gaining a bridgehead into the Pusan Perimeter. Opposing it was the 24th Infantry Division of the Eighth United States Army. Over the next two weeks, US and KPA forces fought a bloody series of engagements inflicting heavy casualties on one another in a confusing series of attacks and counterattacks, but neither side was able to gain the upper hand. In the end, the US forces, aided by reinforcements, air support and heavy weapons, destroyed the KPA force which was hampered by lack of supply and high desertion rates.

The battle was a turning point in the war for the KPA, which had seen previous victories owing to superior numbers and equipment. UN forces now had a numerical superiority and more equipment, including M4 Sherman tanks and heavy weapons capable of defeating the KPA T-34 tanks.

== Background ==
=== Outbreak of war ===
Following the 25 June 1950 outbreak of the Korean War after the invasion of South Korea by North Korea, the United Nations decided to commit troops to the conflict on behalf of South Korea. The United States subsequently committed ground forces to the Korean Peninsula with the goal of fighting back the North Korean invasion and to prevent South Korea from collapsing. However, US forces in the Far East had been steadily decreasing since the end of World War II, five years earlier, and at the time the closest forces were the 24th Infantry Division, headquartered in Japan. The division was understrength, and most of its equipment was antiquated due to reductions in military spending. Regardless, the 24th was ordered to South Korea.

The 24th Infantry Division was the first US unit sent into Korea with the mission to take the initial "shock" of KPA advances, delaying much larger KPA units to buy time to allow reinforcements to arrive. The division was consequently alone for several weeks as it attempted to delay the KPA, making time for the 1st Cavalry and the 7th and 25th Infantry Divisions, along with other Eighth Army supporting units, to move into position. Advance elements of the 24th Division were badly defeated in the Battle of Osan on July 5, the first encounter between US and KPA forces. For the first month after the defeat of Task Force Smith, 24th Division was repeatedly defeated and forced south by superior KPA numbers and equipment. The regiments of the 24th Division were systematically pushed south in engagements around Chochiwon, Chonan, and Pyongtaek. The 24th made a final stand in the Battle of Taejon, where it was almost completely destroyed but delaying KPA forces until July 20. By that time, the Eighth Army's force of combat troops were roughly equal to KPA forces attacking the region, with new UN units arriving every day.

=== North Korean advance ===
With Taejon captured, KPA forces began surrounding the Pusan Perimeter from all sides in an attempt to envelop it. The KPA 4th and 6th Divisions advanced south in a wide flanking maneuver. The two divisions attempted to envelop the UN's left flank, but became extremely spread out in the process. They advanced on UN positions with armor and superior numbers, repeatedly pushing back UN forces.

UN forces were pushed back repeatedly before finally halting the KPA advance in a series of engagements in the southern section of the country. Forces of the 3rd Battalion, 29th Infantry Regiment, newly arrived in the country, were wiped out at Hadong in a coordinated ambush by KPA forces on July 27, opening a pass to the Pusan area. Soon after, KPA forces took Chinju to the west, pushing back the US 19th Infantry Regiment and leaving routes to the Pusan open for more KPA attacks. US formations were subsequently able to defeat and push back the KPA on the flank in the Battle of the Notch on August 2. Suffering mounting losses, the KPA force in the west withdrew for several days to re-equip and receive reinforcements. This granted both sides a reprieve to prepare for the attack on the Pusan Perimeter.

=== Naktong Bulge ===
About 7 miles (11 km) north of the point where it turns east and is joined by the Nam River, the Naktong River curves westward opposite Yongsan in a wide semicircular loop. For most of this span, the Naktong is around 400 metres (1,300 ft) wide and 6 feet (1.8 m) deep, allowing infantry to wade across with some difficulty but preventing vehicles from crossing without assistance. This perimeter was defended by a network of observation posts on the high ground, manned by 24th Infantry. Forces in reserve would counterattack any attempted crossings by KPA. Artillery and mortar fire units were also deployed so large amounts of fire could be delivered on any one spot. The division was extremely dispersed, already understrength, it presented a very thin line.

== Battle ==
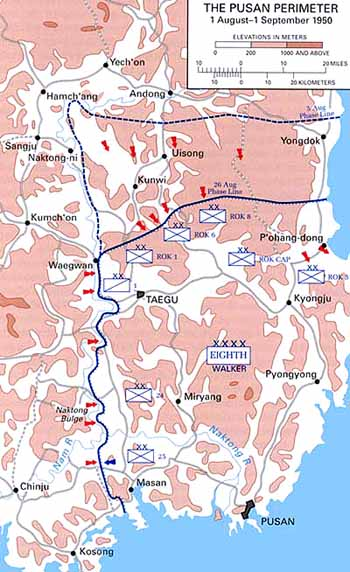
Tactical map of the Pusan Perimeter in August 1950. The 24th Infantry held a position on the western line.

The 24th US Infantry Division, under the command of Major general John H. Church, occupied a region some 16 miles (26 km) long along the Naktong River. The 34th Infantry Regiment occupied the southern half, west of Yongsan while the 21st Infantry Regiment occupied the northern half, west of Changyong. The 19th Infantry Regiment, meanwhile, was re-equipping in the rear of the lines. In all, the 24th and its supporting units had a strength of 14,540 on August 5.

Opposing the 24th Infantry was the KPA 4th Division, under the command of Major general Lee Kwon Mu. Both Mu and his division were highly decorated for their exploits so far in the war, particularly during the First Battle of Seoul. By August 4 the 4th Division had concentrated all of its regiments in the vicinity of Hyopch'on. It stood at a strength of about 7,000 with 1,500 in each infantry regiment.

=== North Korean attack ===
At midnight on the night of August 5–6, 800 KPA soldiers of the 3rd Battalion, 16th Regiment waded across the river at the Ohang ferry site, (35.474°N 128.421°E) 3.5 miles (5.6 km) south of Pugong-ni and west of Yongsan, carrying light weapons and supplies over their heads or on rafts. A second force attempted to cross further north but was hit with machine gun and artillery fire, falling back in confusion. At 02:00 on August 6, the KPA began engaging the forces of 3rd Battalion, 34th Infantry and moved forward after a small fight, attempting to penetrate the lines to Yongsan. KPA infantry forced 3rd Battalion back, and they abandoned their command post to consolidate their position. The attack caught the Americans by surprise as US commanders expected the KPA to attempt a crossing further north. The landing threatened to split the US lines and disrupt supply lines to positions further north. Subsequently, the KPA were able to capture a large amount of US equipment.

=== US counterattack ===
The 34th Infantry's regimental headquarters ordered the 1st Battalion to counterattack the KPA. When 1st Battalion arrived at 3rd Battalion's former command post, it was ambushed by KPA troops on the high ground. C Company, the first to arrive, suffered over fifty percent casualties. A and B Companies counterattacked with tanks and armor, eventually rescuing the beleaguered C Company. At around 20:00, A Company made contact with L Company, 3rd Battalion, still in its positions on the river, radioing that the KPA had penetrated eastward north of the Yongsan-Naktong River road to Cloverleaf Hill (35.45°N 128.436°E), but had not yet crossed south of the road to Obong-ni Ridge (35.435°N 128.444°E). The KPA had penetrated 3 miles (4.8 km) east of the Naktong and halfway to Yongsan.

Several units of the 34th Regiment began to retreat north and into the 21st Infantry's lines, but Church ordered them turned around. He also ordered the 19th Infantry to counterattack west along the northern flank of the 34th Infantry to help oppose the KPA. Although the 24th Infantry was repulsed closer to the river, 1 mile (1.6 km) inland the 19th Infantry trapped about 300 KPA in a village and killed most of them.

The 1st Battalion, 34th Infantry, had managed to block the KPA advance to Yongsan while the 19th Infantry was able to push it back and inflict substantial casualties. However, by the evening of August 6, the KPA held firmly on to their bridgehead. Attempted crossings that night were repulsed to the south by Republic of Korea Army (ROKA) forces, but an unknown number of reinforcements were moved across the river the night of August 6–7. On August 7–8, the KPA tried to move two more battalions across the river to the north, but were repulsed by 21st Infantry, which was still in place. The KPA battalions were shifted south to cross at the bridgehead, instead. By August 8, an estimated KPA regiment were across the Naktong.

=== Counterattacks ===
American counterattacks continued into the morning of August 7, but the gains were slow, hampered by the hot weather and a lack of food and water. The KPA were able to press forward and regain the Cloverleaf Hill and Obong-ni Ridge, critical terrain astride the main road in the bulge area. By 16:00 that day, the 9th Infantry Regiment, 2nd Infantry Division, a unit newly arrived in Korea, was sent to the region. Church immediately ordered it to attack the KPA salient at the bulge. 9th Infantry was fresh and well-equipped. They were also inexperienced, many of their number being reservists. Despite a tenacious attack, the 9th Infantry was only able to regain part of Cloverleaf Hill before intense fighting stalled its movement.

KPA forces began making gains in the hills along the river adjacent to their bridgehead, against positions of the 34th Infantry. Coordinated attacks pushed A Company to the north back from their hills with heavy casualties on August 7. K Company to the south was also attacked but held its line, reinforced by L Company on August 10. Fighting continued for several days, resulting in heavy casualties as both sides captured and recaptured the hills along the Naktong, neither side able to gain a decisive advantage against the other.

=== Task Force Hill ===
In an attempt to destroy the KPA bridgehead, Church assembled a large force under the 9th Infantry Regiment. Dubbed Task Force Hill, this force comprised the 9th, 19th and 34th Infantry Regiments as well as 1st Battalion, 21st Infantry, plus supporting artillery and other attached units. It was assigned to drive the KPA from the east bank of the river on August 11. Commanding the task force was Colonel John G. Hill, the commanding officer of the 9th Infantry Regiment.

The KPA 4th Division, meanwhile, had constructed underwater bridges of sandbags, logs, and rocks, finishing the first on August 10. 4th Division used it to move trucks and heavy artillery as well as additional infantry and a few tanks across the river. By the morning of August 10, an estimated two KPA regiments were across the river and occupying fortified positions. Supplies continued to stream in through rafts. Task Force Hill mounted its attack, but was once again unable to make progress due to the newly established artillery. Its directive to attack quickly became one to dig in and hold its ground, and by nightfall the entire KPA 4th Division was across the river. On August 10, elements of the KPA 4th Division began to move south, outflanking Task Force Hill. The next day, scattered KPA elements attacked Yongsan. The KPA repeatedly attacked at night, when American soldiers were resting and had greater difficulty resisting.

=== Reinforcements ===
On August 12, General Walton Walker, in command of the Eighth Army, dispatched part of the 27th Infantry Regiment, 25th Infantry Division, to attack north from the 25th Division's zone to drive off KPA 4th Division troops moving into Yongsan. Simultaneously, Church assembled all the combat service support soldiers he could and formed them into a combat unit to block further penetration of KPA forces, which were setting up roadblocks on the roads from Yongsan.

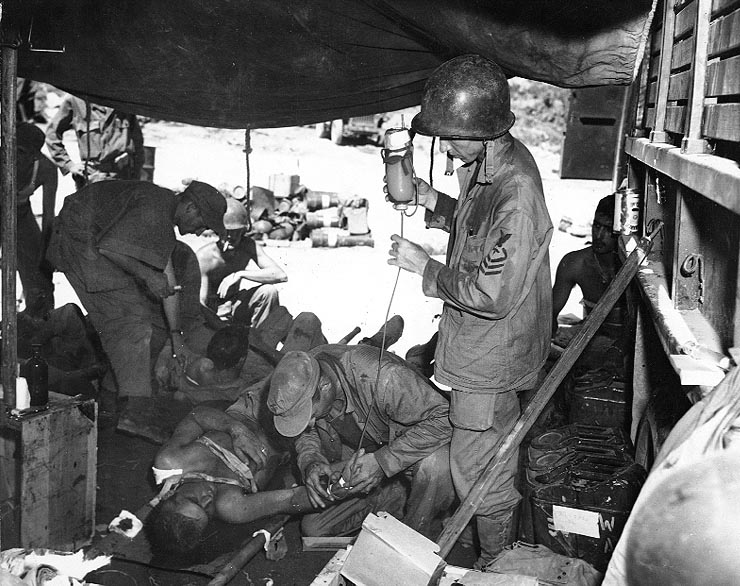
US Marines treat a casualty from the front line of the battle, August 17.

Additional reinforcements poured in. The rest of the 27th Infantry moved in, as well as a battalion from the 23rd Infantry Regiment, 2nd Infantry Division. These were able to push KPA infiltrators out of Yongsan and back to their firmly held positions at Cloverleaf Hill. On August 14, following an artillery barrage, Task Force Hill launched a direct assault on these positions. Fighting continued the entire day in a fierce series of attacks and counterattacks in which both sides, already at far reduced strength, inflicted large numbers of casualties. However, Task Force Hill's second attack was just as unsuccessful as its first. Casualties among officers was high in the fight, and the disorganization that followed meant most of the units in the fight could not communicate to coordinate any large actions. It became a battle of attrition by August 15 as neither the KPA 4th Division nor Task Force Hill were able to get the upper hand in the fight, which in several cases erupted in desperate hand-to-hand combat. Casualties mounted and a frustrated Walker ordered the 5,000-man 1st Provisional Marine Brigade to the area to turn the tide. The brigade moved from the Masan region in the middle of a counteroffensive being conducted by the 25th US Infantry.

The KPA 4th Division in the meantime was suffering serious logistical setbacks from lack of food, equipment, ammunition and, weapons. Conscripts from local South Korean villages were brought in to replace mounting losses. There was also virtually no provision for the wounded in the division, and the KPA forces began to come apart under these stresses. Still, the division's morale remained relatively high and General Lee refused to withdraw.

=== Destruction of the bridgehead ===
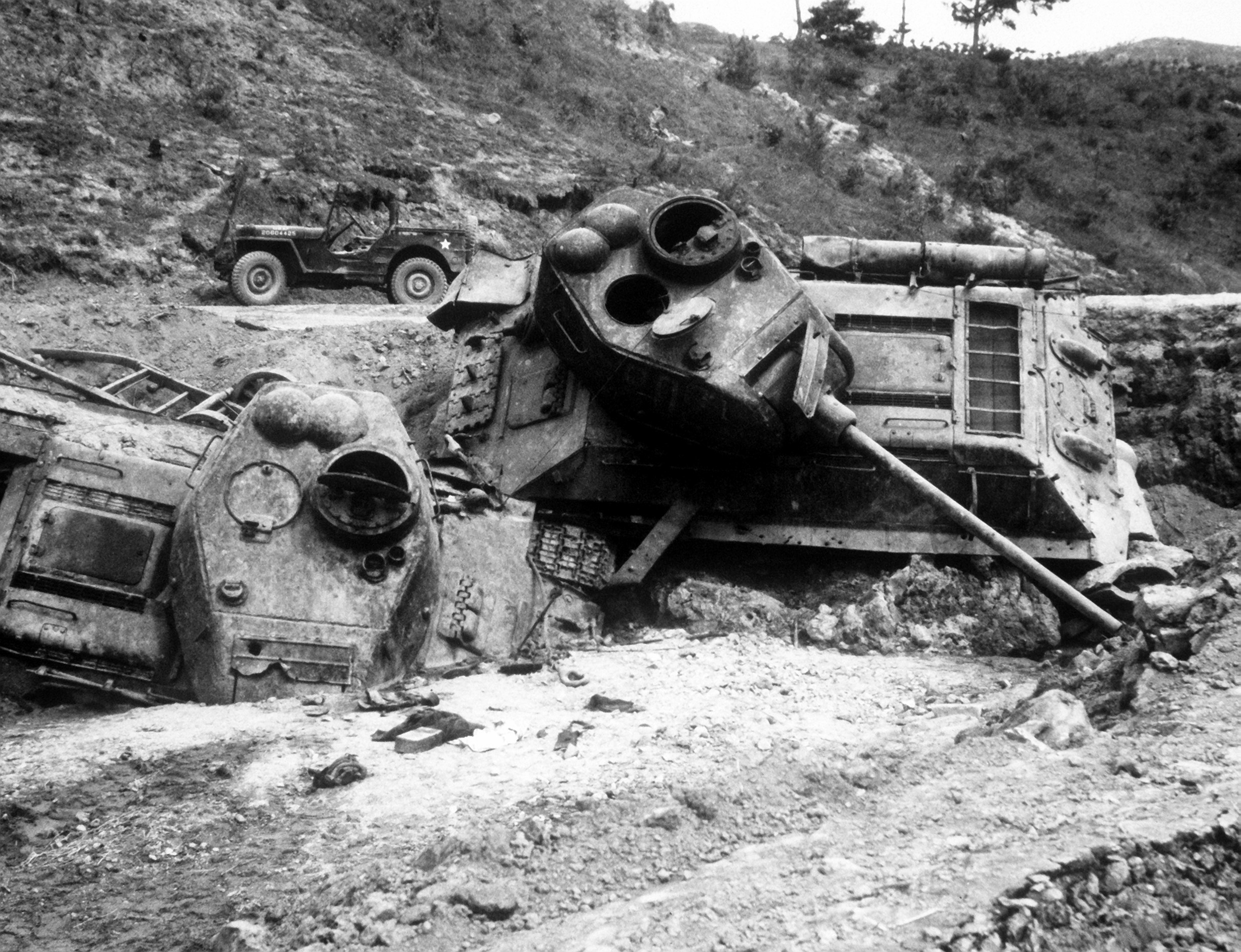
North Korean T-34 tanks destroyed by US Air Force bombs near Waegwan.

The 1st Marine Provisional Brigade, in conjunction with Task Force Hill, mounted a massive attack on Cloverleaf Hill and Obong-ni on August 17. The offensive began at 08:00 on August 17, with US forces unleashing all heavy weapons available to them against the KPA positions; artillery, mortars, M26 Pershing tanks and airstrikes.

At first, tenacious KPA defense halted the Marines who responded with artillery, raking Cloverleaf Hill. Heavy indirect fire forced the KPA out of their positions before the Marines and Task Force Hill eventually overwhelmed them, one hill at a time. The Marines approached Obong-ni first, destroying resistance on the slope with an airstrike and a barrage from US tanks, but strong resistance caused heavy casualties, and they had to withdraw. The KPA 18th Regiment, in control of the hill, mounted a disastrous counterattack in hopes of pushing the Marines back. The division's tactics of cutting off supplies and relying on surprise, which had provided them so much success up to this point, failed in the face of massive US numerical superiority.

By nightfall on August 18, KPA 4th Division had been annihilated; huge numbers of deserters had weakened its numbers during the fight, but by that time, Obong-ni and Cloverleaf Hill had been retaken by the US forces. Scattered groups of KPA soldiers fled back across the Naktong, pursued by American planes and artillery fire. The next day, the remains of 4th Division had withdrawn across the river. In their hasty retreat, they left a large number of artillery pieces and equipment behind which the Americans later pressed into service.

== Aftermath ==
The battle caused massive casualties for both sides. By the end of the fight, KPA 4th Division had been completely destroyed, with only 300 or 400 men in each of its regiments. Of its original 7,000 men, the division now had a strength of only 3,500, having suffered over 1,200 killed. Several thousand of the members of the division deserted during the fight. Most of these men were South Korean civilians forcibly conscripted into the KPA. 4th Division would not recover until much later in the war. The battle represented a new phase in the war for the KPA. Their numerical superiority was gone, and their strategy of attacking supply lines and rear formations of US units was no longer effective without overwhelming numbers. Additionally, the advantage the T-34 tank had once provided was also gone; American units were now well equipped with effective anti-tank weapons, as well as larger numbers of tanks of their own. Subsequently, all 4th Division's T-34s were quickly knocked out before they could inflict much damage.

The 9th Infantry and supporting units sustained 57 killed, 106 wounded, two captured, and 13 missing, a total of 180 casualties. The 21st Infantry suffered around 30 killed and 70 wounded, the 19th Infantry around 450 casualties, and the 34th Infantry around 400. The 27th Infantry reported around 150. The 1st Provisional Brigade reported 66 Marines dead, 278 wounded, and one missing. In total, American forces suffered around 1,800 casualties during the conflict, including about a third them killed.

In memory of the battle at Naktong Bulge, as well as other conflicts along the Pusan Perimeter and the Battle of Taegu, the South Korean government set up the Nakdong River Battle Museum along the river in the vicinity of the conflict in 1979, which includes a number of artifacts from the Korean War as well as a memorial to those killed during the war.

== See also ==
- Hill 303 massacre
