= Livingston, Kentucky =

- City
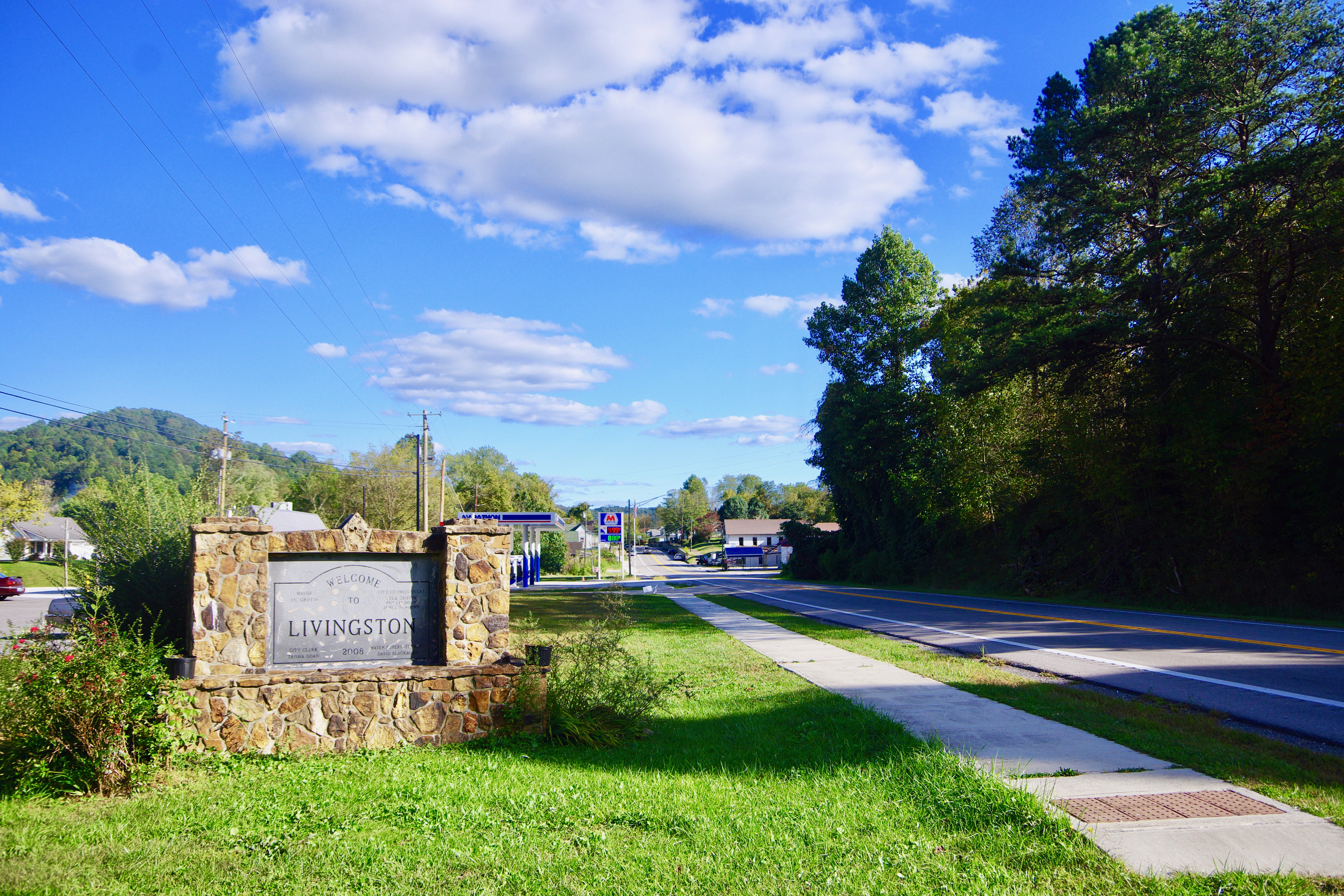
- Welcome sign along US 25

- Location of Livingston in Rockcastle County, Kentucky.
- Coordinates: 37°17′53″N 84°12′56″W
- Country: United States
- State: Kentucky
- County: Rockcastle
- Incorporated: 1880
- Reincorporated: 1943
- Named for: a local landowner

Area
  - Total: 0.32 sq mi (0.84 km^{2})
  - Land: 0.31 sq mi (0.81 km^{2})
  - Water: 0.012 sq mi (0.03 km^{2})
- Elevation: 919 ft (280 m)

Population (2020)
  - Total: 166
  - Density: 530.7/sq mi (204.92/km^{2})
- Time zone: UTC-5 (Eastern (EST))
  - Summer (DST): UTC-4 (EDT)
- ZIP code: 40445
- Area code: 606
- FIPS code: 21-47098
- GNIS feature ID: 2404943
- Website: www.livingstonky.com

Livingston is a home rule-class city in Rockcastle County, Kentucky, in the United States. The population was 116 during the 2020 U.S. census. It is part of the Richmond-Berea micropolitan area.

== History ==
The first post office at the site was known as Fish Point and opened in 1840. The L&N reached the settlement in 1870 and named its station after James Livingston, a local landowner. The post office was renamed Livingston Station in 1879 and, following the city's 1880 incorporation, Livingston in 1882.

== Geography ==
According to the United States Census Bureau, the city has a total area of 0.3 square miles (0.78 km^{2}), all land. Livingston is located along U.S. Route 25 southeast of Mt. Vernon and northwest of London. The city's municipal area extends southward to the Rockcastle River. The Daniel Boone National Forest surrounds Livingston, and the Sheltowee Trace Trail passes through the city.

== Demographics ==
Historical population
Census	Pop.	Note	%±
1900	605		—
1910	685		13.2%
1920	703		2.6%
1930	912		29.7%
1940	669		−26.6%
1950	378		−43.5%
1960	419		10.8%
1970	338		−19.3%
1980	334		−1.2%
1990	241		−27.8%
2000	228		−5.4%
2010	226		−0.9%
2020	166		−26.5%
U.S. Decennial Census

As of the census of 2000, there were 228 people, 104 households, and 63 families residing in the city. The population density was 704.4 inhabitants per square mile (272.0/km^{2}). There were 122 housing units at an average density of 376.9 per square mile (145.5/km^{2}). The racial makeup of the city was 96.05% White and 3.95% Native American. Hispanic or Latino of any race were 3.51% of the population.

There were 104 households, out of which 24.0% had children under the age of 18 living with them, 43.3% were married couples living together, 16.3% had a female householder with no husband present, and 38.5% were non-families. 35.6% of all households were made up of individuals, and 22.1% had someone living alone who was 65 years of age or older. The average household size was 2.19 and the average family size was 2.86.

In the city, the population was spread out, with 20.6% under the age of 18, 7.9% from 18 to 24, 28.1% from 25 to 44, 22.8% from 45 to 64, and 20.6% who were 65 years of age or older. The median age was 38 years. For every 100 females there were 93.2 males. For every 100 females age 18 and over, there were 88.5 males.

The median income for a household in the city was $17,500, and the median income for a family was $35,972. Males had a median income of $26,250 versus $20,313 for females. The per capita income for the city was $11,734. About 19.0% of families and 26.6% of the population were below the poverty line, including 14.7% of those under the age of eighteen and 48.7% of those sixty-five or over.

== Current events ==
Livingston is a community steeped in a tradition of country, bluegrass and spiritual music. On weekends, area residents gather to events downtown that celebrate their music and heritage.

In August 2021, State Governor Andy Beshear appointed Donna Montgomery-Durham as Livingston City Commissioner.

In November 2023, on the Wednesday before Thanksgiving, a CSX freight train derailed in Livingston, with some tanker cars spilling molten sulfur and catching fire. With the potential for a potentially harmful sulfur dioxide release, the area was evacuated for Thanksgiving Day. As Beshear declared a state of emergency and activated the Emergency Operations Center, the town's emergency made national news. The fire was extinguished on Thanksgiving Day, and people were allowed to return home.

== Climate ==
The climate in this area is characterized by hot, humid summers and generally mild to cool winters. According to the Köppen Climate Classification system, Livingston has a humid subtropical climate, abbreviated "Cfa" on climate maps.

== Notable people ==
- Private First Class David Monroe Smith (1926–1950), Medal of Honor recipient for his service during the Korean War

== See also ==
- List of cities in Kentucky
