= 9th Division (North Korea) =

The 9th Infantry Division (Korean: 조선인민군 륙군 제9사단) was a military formation of the Korean People's Army during the 20th Century.

It was part of the North Korean advance from Seoul to Taejon.

They fought in the Battle of Pusan Perimeter.
