= 4th Division (North Korea) =

Korean People's Army Ground Force combat formation

Guards Seoul Kim Chaek 4th Infantry Division
- North Korean Guards badge
- Active: 1948 - Present
- Country: North Korea
- Allegiance: Korean People's Army
- Branch: Korean People's Army Ground Force
- Type: Infantry
- Size: Division
- Patron: Kim Chaek
- Engagements: Korean War
- Decorations: Guards badge

Commanders
- Notable commanders: Kim Chaek; Major General Lee Kwon Mu

The 4th Infantry Division is a military formation of the Korean People's Army.

== History ==
Activated in late 1948, the 4th Infantry Division in the summer of 1950 consisted of the 5th, 16th, and 18th Infantry regiments, plus an artillery regiment and antitank, self-propelled gun, engineer, signal, medical, and training battalions. Each infantry regiment had three battalions, while the artillery regiment had a battalion of 122-mm howitzers and two battalions of 76-mm guns. The division's basic triangular organization strongly resembled that of an American infantry division, except for its smaller artillery contingent and its much reduced logistical apparatus. The division's authorized strength was 10,381 officers and men, with most of its fighting power concentrated in the 2,590-man infantry regiments.

Commanded by Maj. Gen. Lee Kwon Mu, a veteran of the Chinese Communist Forces and former NKPA chief of staff, and composed largely of ethnic Koreans who had fought in the Chinese Civil War, the division had played a major role in the capture of the South Korean capital, Seoul. Its success in that campaign had won it the title of "Seoul Division." Continuing southward, the 4th Division had defeated Task Force Smith in early July, and it had been pushing the US 24th Division backward ever since. In exchange for the ground gained, however, the 4th Division had suffered severely. By the time it reached the Naktong River, its strength was estimated by the Eighth Army Intelligence Section to be no more than 8,000 men, and its artillery component had been reduced to only twelve guns. Nevertheless, the 4th Division still held the initiative and began immediate preparations to launch an assault across the river. At 0001 on August 6, 1950, elements of the 16th Infantry Regiment began crossing the Naktong in the vicinity of the Naktong Bulge on rafts constructed earlier in the day. Opposing the 4th Division was the 24th Infantry Division's 21st and 34th Regiments, along with the ROK 17th Infantry Regiment.

The division fought in the Battle of Pusan Perimeter.
