= Yeongsan =

- Town
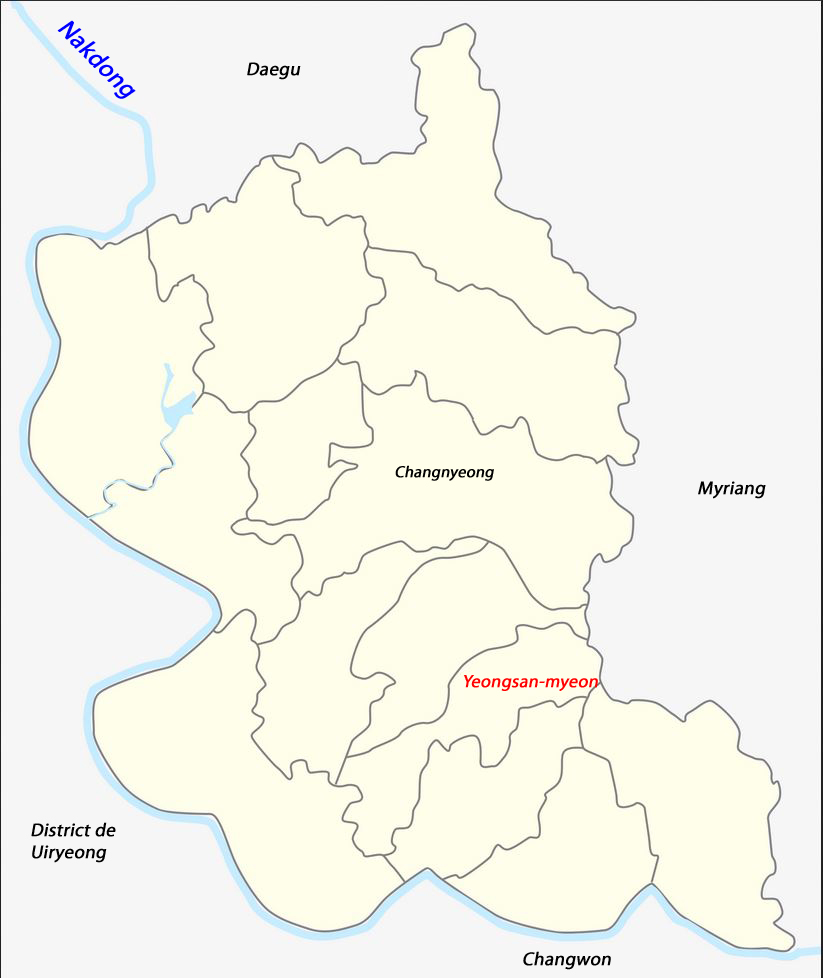
- Location in South Korea
- Coordinates: 35°27′15″N 128°31′31″E
- Country: South Korea
- Region: South Gyeongsang Province

Area
  - Total: 29.36 km^{2} (11.34 sq mi)

Population (2011)
  - Total: 6,047
- Time zone: UTC+09:00

Korean name
- Hangul: 영산면
- Hanja: 靈山面
- RR: Yeongsan-myeon
- MR: Yŏngsan-myŏn

Yeongsan-myeon (Korean: 영산면; also known as Yongsan) is a myeon of Changnyeong County, South Gyeongsang Province, in South Korea.

At Yeongsan the Battle of Yongsan was an engagement in the Korean War. It was part of the Battle of Pusan Perimeter and was one of several large engagements fought simultaneously.

== History ==
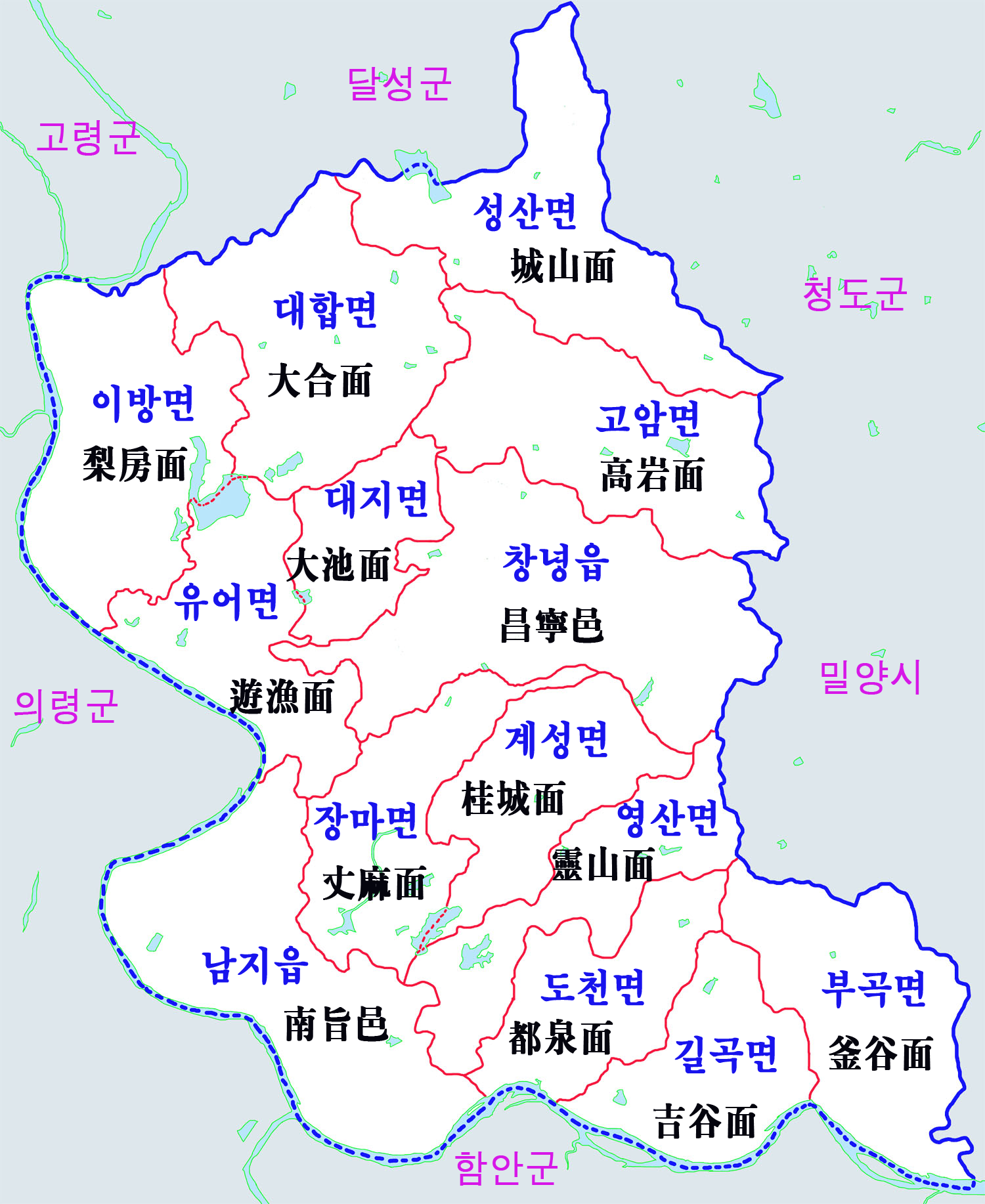
Changnyeong County

== See also ==
- Battle of Yongsan
- Changnyeong County
