= Liška =

Liška (feminine: Lišková) is a Czech surname, meaning 'fox'. The oldest mention of the surname is from 1442. Notable people with the surname include:

- Ad Liska (1906–1998), American baseball player
- Adam Liška (born 1999), Slovak ice hockey player
- Allen Liska (1940–1998), American sociologist
- Alois Liška (1895–1977), Czech army officer who served in both World Wars
- Antonín Liška (1924–2003), Czech Roman Catholic clergyman
- Bernard J. Liska (1931–2002), American food scientist
- Emanuel Krescenc Liška (1852–1903), Czech painter and illustrator
- Hana Lišková (born 1952), Czech gymnast
- Hans Liska (1907–1983), Austrian-German artist
- Hermine Liska (1930–2024), Austrian Jehovah's Witness
- Jan Kryštof Liška (c. 1650–1712), Czech painter
- Jiří Liška (handballer) (born 1952), Czech handball player
- Jiří Liška (politician) (1949–2025), Czech politician and veterinarian
- Jiří Liška (footballer) (born 1982), Czech footballer
- Lee Ann Liska, American hospital administrator
- Ludvík Liška (1929–2021), Czech runner
- Martin Liška (born 1976), Slovak cyclist
- Ondřej Liška (born 1977), Czech politician
- Pavel Liška (born 1972), Czech actor
- Stanislava Lišková (born 1997), Slovak footballer
- Věra Lišková (1924–1985), Czech glass artist
- Vivian Liska, American academic
- Zdeněk Liška (1922–1983), Czech composer

== See also ==
- Lischka, a Germanised version of the surname
- Liska (disambiguation)
