= Richardson Township =

Richardson Township may refer to:

- Richardson Township, Randolph County, Arkansas, in Randolph County, Arkansas
- Richardson Township, Morrison County, Minnesota
- Richardson Township, Butler County, Nebraska
