= Dwight, Nebraska =

Village in Nebraska, US

- Village
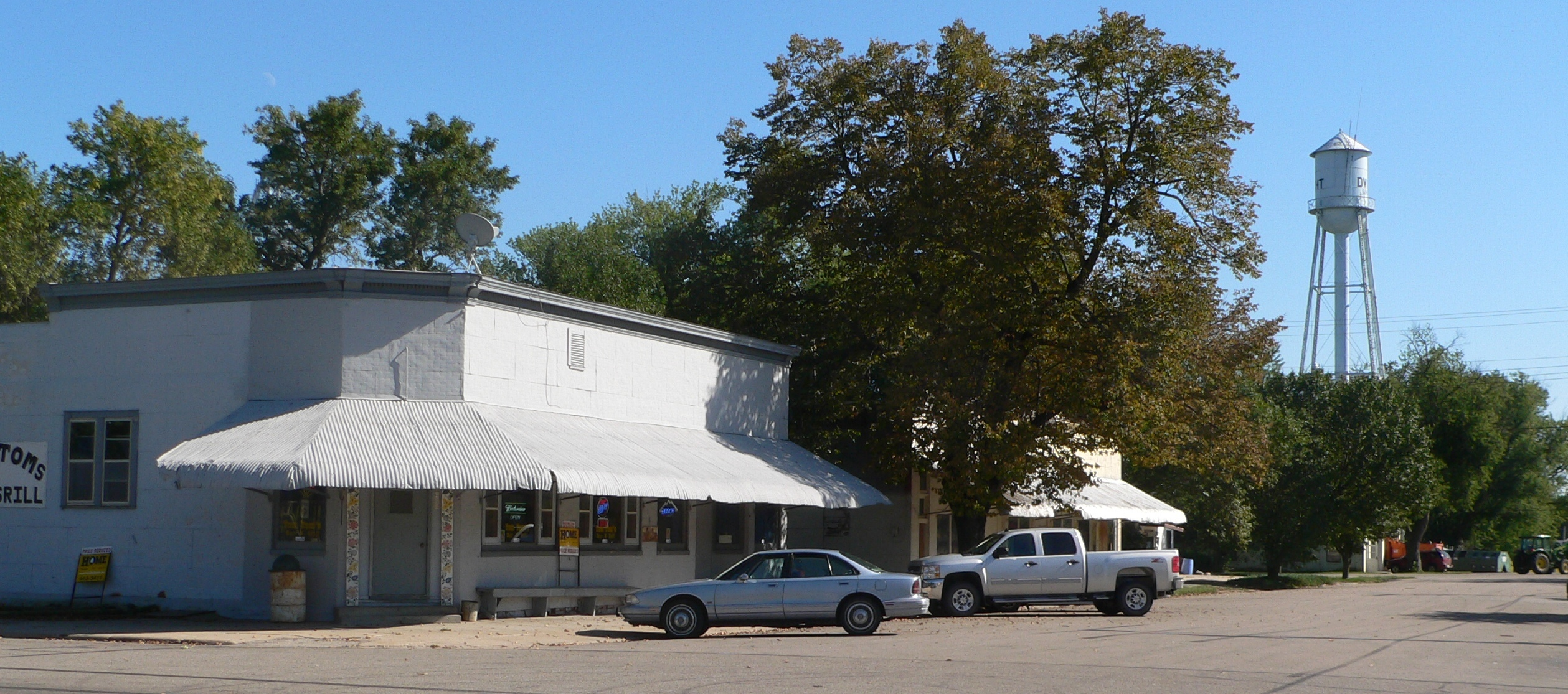
- Downtown Dwight: 2nd Street

- Location of Dwight, Nebraska

- Location within Nebraska Location within the United States
- Coordinates: 41°04′58″N 97°01′09″W
- Country: United States
- State: Nebraska
- County: Butler
- Township: Richardson

Area
  - Total: 0.24 sq mi (0.62 km^{2})
  - Land: 0.24 sq mi (0.62 km^{2})
  - Water: 0 sq mi (0.00 km^{2})
- Elevation: 1,621 ft (494 m)

Population (2020)
  - Total: 229
  - Density: 949/sq mi (366.5/km^{2})
- Time zone: UTC-6 (Central (CST))
  - Summer (DST): UTC-5 (CDT)
- ZIP code: 68635
- Area code: 402
- FIPS code: 31-14065
- GNIS feature ID: 2398765

Dwight is a village in Butler County, Nebraska, United States. As of the 2020 census, Dwight had a population of 229.

== History ==
Dwight was started in 1887 when the Fremont, Elkhorn and Missouri Valley Railroad was extended to that point. The fact that a large share of the early settlers were natives of Dwight, Illinois caused the name to be selected.

== Geography ==
According to the United States Census Bureau, the village has a total area of 0.25 square miles (0.65 km^{2}), all land.

== Demographics ==
Historical population
Census	Pop.	Note	%±
1910	184		—
1920	309		67.9%
1930	323		4.5%
1940	294		−9.0%
1950	218		−25.9%
1960	209		−4.1%
1970	224		7.2%
1980	221		−1.3%
1990	227		2.7%
2000	259		14.1%
2010	204		−21.2%
2020	229		12.3%
U.S. Decennial Census

=== 2010 census ===
As of the census of 2010, there were 204 people, 94 households, and 57 families living in the village. The population density was 816.0 inhabitants per square mile (315.1/km^{2}). There were 108 housing units at an average density of 432.0 per square mile (166.8/km^{2}). The racial makeup of the village was 100.0% White.

There were 94 households, of which 27.7% had children under the age of 18 living with them, 52.1% were married couples living together, 6.4% had a female householder with no husband present, 2.1% had a male householder with no wife present, and 39.4% were non-families. 33.0% of all households were made up of individuals, and 12.8% had someone living alone who was 65 years of age or older. The average household size was 2.17 and the average family size was 2.77.

The median age in the village was 46.4 years. 23.5% of residents were under the age of 18; 2.4% were between the ages of 18 and 24; 21.1% were from 25 to 44; 34.3% were from 45 to 64; and 18.6% were 65 years of age or older. The gender makeup of the village was 45.6% male and 54.4% female.

=== 2000 census ===
As of the census of 2000, there were 259 people, 116 households, and 64 families living in the village. The population density was 1,070.0 inhabitants per square mile (413.1/km^{2}). There were 128 housing units at an average density of 528.8 per square mile (204.2/km^{2}). The racial makeup of the village was 99.23% White, 0.39% Native American, and 0.39% from two or more races.

There were 116 households, out of which 26.7% had children under the age of 18 living with them, 49.1% were married couples living together, 5.2% had a female householder with no husband present, and 44.8% were non-families. 43.1% of all households were made up of individuals, and 19.0% had someone living alone who was 65 years of age or older. The average household size was 2.23 and the average family size was 3.13.

In the village, the population was spread out, with 27.8% under the age of 18, 3.5% from 18 to 24, 29.3% from 25 to 44, 20.1% from 45 to 64, and 19.3% who were 65 years of age or older. The median age was 38 years. For every 100 females, there were 94.7 males. For every 100 females age 18 and over, there were 98.9 males.

As of 2000 the median income for a household in the village was $35,000, and the median income for a family was $38,125. Males had a median income of $30,417 versus $17,500 for females. The per capita income for the village was $26,010. None of the families and 2.2% of the population were living below the poverty line.

== Notable people ==
- Ernest Richard Kouma, Medal of Honor recipient
- Ad Liska, baseball player
- Alfredo Ernest Novak, Roman Catholic bishop
