= Paul Bellair =

American sociologist

Paul E. Bellair is a professor of sociology at Ohio State University, where he has taught since 1995. He was educated at the State University of New York at Albany (B.A. magna cum laude in sociology, 1990; M.A. in sociology, 1992; Ph.D. in sociology, 1995). His Ph.D. committee was chaired by Allen Liska, and also included Steven Messner and Marv Krohn. He is known for researching multiple aspects of crime, including life-course criminology, community context, and race and crime.
