= Marvin Krohn =

American criminologist

- Born: March 5, 1947 (age 79); Glen Ridge, New Jersey
- Education: College of Wooster; University of Maryland; Florida State University
- Known for: Juvenile delinquency
- Awards: Inducted into Florida State University College of Criminology Hall of Fame in 2016
- Scientific career
- Fields: Criminology
- Institutions: Western Illinois University; University of Iowa; State University of New York at Albany; University of Florida
- Thesis: Social change and social disorganization: a cross-polity study of the effects of social change on indices of crime and suicide (1974)
- Academic advisors: Ronald Akers
- Doctoral students: Paul Bellair

Marvin Donald "Marv" Krohn (born March 5, 1947) is an American criminologist who has been a professor at the University of Florida since 2008.

He was formerly the director of the Division of Criminology, Law and Society there until 2011.

Krohn is currently co-editor of the journal Justice Quarterly.
