= Ernest R. Kouma =

United States Army Medal of Honor recipient

Ernest Richard Kouma
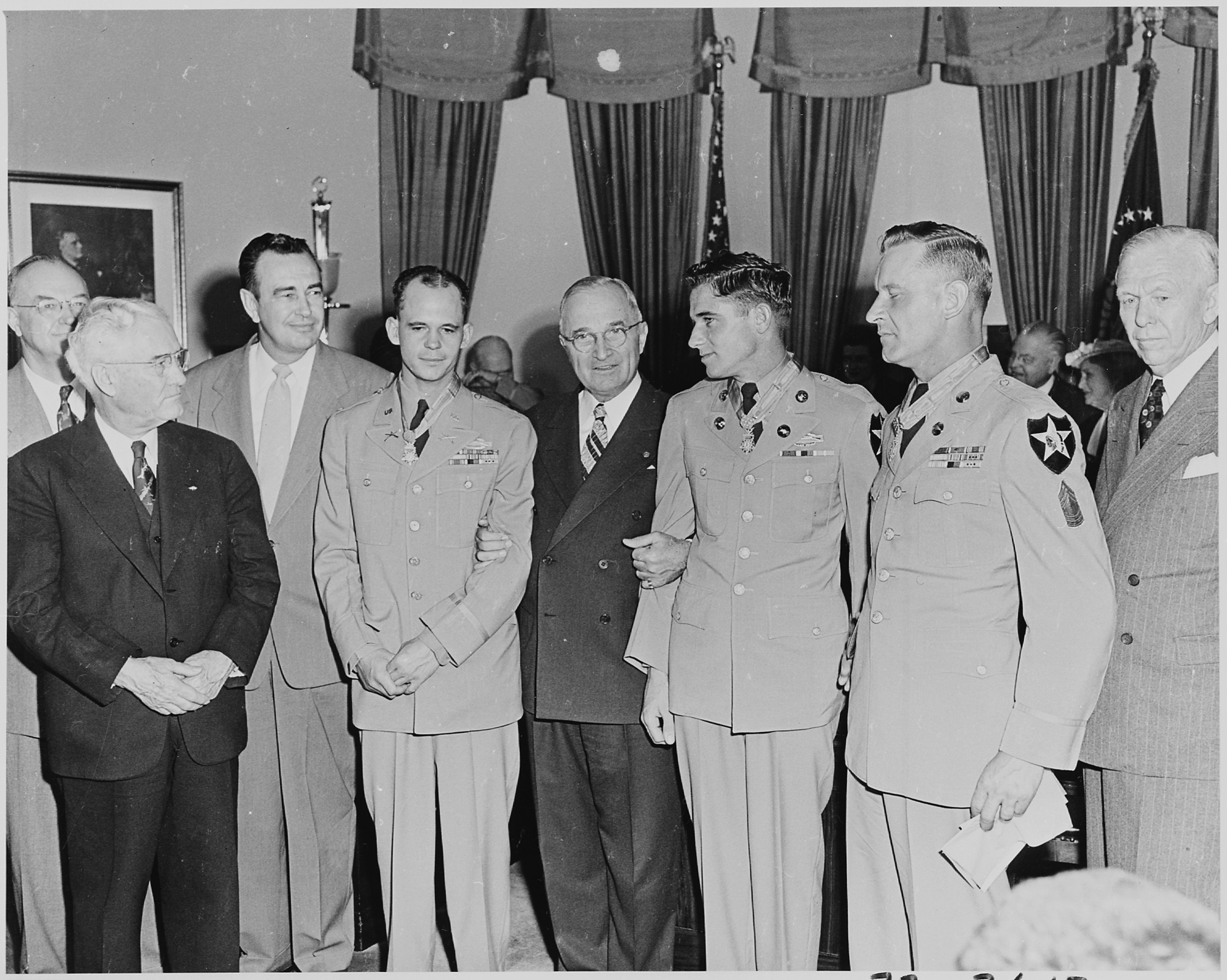
- Kouma (second from right) and other Medal of Honor recipients with President Harry S. Truman (center) shortly after being presented with their medals.
- Born: November 23, 1919; Dwight, Nebraska, US
- Died: December 19, 1993 (aged 74); McDaniels, Kentucky, US
- Burial place: Fort Knox Post Cemetery, Fort Knox, Kentucky
- Military career
- Allegiance: United States
- Branch: United States Army
- Service years: 1940–1971
- Rank: Master Sergeant
- Units: 9th Armored Division; 2nd Infantry Division
- Conflicts: World War II: Battle of the Bulge; Battle of Bastogne; Korean War: Battle of Pusan Perimeter; 2nd Battle of Naktong Bulge (WIA)
- Awards: Medal of Honor; Purple Heart (2)

Ernest Richard Kouma (November 23, 1919 – December 19, 1993) was a soldier in the United States Army during World War II and the Korean War. He rose to the rank of master sergeant and received the Medal of Honor for his actions on August 31 and September 1, 1950, during the Second Battle of Naktong Bulge in South Korea.

Born in Nebraska, Kouma grew up on a family farm before enlisting in the Army in 1940. Kouma served as a tank commander during World War II, seeing combat in Germany with the 9th Armored Division from 1944 to 1945. After that war, Kouma served as part of the occupation force in South Korea and Japan.

On the outbreak of the Korean War, Kouma commanded an M26 Pershing tank in the 2nd Infantry Division. While fighting during the Battle of Pusan Perimeter along the Naktong River, Kouma commanded his tank as it single-handedly fended off repeated North Korean attempts to cross the river after units around it had withdrawn. Wounded twice, Kouma killed 250 North Korean troops in this action.

After receiving the medal, Kouma served as a recruiter and remained in the Army for 31 years, retiring in 1971. He lived in Kentucky until his death, and is buried in Fort Knox, Kentucky.

== Early life ==
Ernest Richard Kouma was born on November 23, 1919, in Dwight, Nebraska, to a farming family. He spent much of his early life on the family farm before enlisting in the United States Army in June 1940.

== World War II ==
When the United States entered World War II, Kouma was trained as an armor crewman. He was assigned to the 9th Armored Division. The division landed in Normandy late in September 1944 and moved to the front lines on October 23. Its first mission was patrol duty in a quiet sector along the Luxembourg-German frontier. When the Germans launched their winter offensive, the 9th Armored Division was quickly involved in the Battle of the Bulge with next to no experience. The division saw very heavy action at St. Vith, Echternach and Bastogne, its units, unprepared to counter the offensive, fighting in widely separated areas.

The 9th Armored Division made a stand at Bastogne and held off the Germans long enough to enable the 101st Airborne Division to dig in for a defense of the city, resulting in the Battle of Bastogne. After a rest period in January 1945, the 9th Armored Division made preparations for a drive across the Roer River. The offensive was launched on February 28, and the unit smashed across the Roer to Rheinbach, sending patrols into Remagen. The Ludendorff Bridge at Remagen was found intact, and was seized by elements of the 9th Armored minutes before demolition charges were set to explode on March 7, 1945. The division exploited the bridgehead, moving south and east across the Lahn River toward Limburg, where thousands of Allied prisoners were liberated. The division drove on to Frankfurt and then turned to assist in the closing of the Ruhr Pocket. In April, it continued east, encircled Leipzig and secured a line along the Mulde River. The division was shifting south to Czechoslovakia when the war in Europe ended on V-E Day in May 1945.

Following the end of the war, Kouma decided to stay in the Army. He was moved to South Korea for occupation duties before being moved to Japan for the post-war occupation of that country. Eventually, Kouma was assigned as a tank commander in A Company, 72nd Tank Battalion, 2nd Infantry Division, which was stationed at Fort Lewis, Washington. By this time, he had a home in Penobscot County, Maine, when he was not at Fort Lewis.

== Korean War ==
Following the outbreak of war between North Korea and South Korea on June 25, 1950, the United States mobilized a large contingent of troops to send into the beleaguered country. Initially, units occupying Japan were sent, but forces were eventually dispatched from the United States. In August 1950, Kouma, who was then a sergeant first class, sailed for Korea along with much of the 2nd Infantry Division. It arrived there in late August and was moved into the line at the Pusan Perimeter, where American troops were holding a tight defensive line around the port city of Pusan.

The North Korean People's Army, meanwhile, was preparing for a September offensive by capturing the Miryang and Samnangjin areas to cut off the 2nd Division's route of supply and withdrawal between Daegu and Busan. However, the North Koreans were unaware that the 2nd Infantry Division had recently replaced the 24th Infantry Division in positions along the Naktong River. Consequently, they expected lighter resistance; the troops of the 24th were exhausted from months of fighting, but the men of the 2nd Division were fresh and newly arrived in Korea. They had only established their lines shortly before the North Koreans began their attack. The North Koreans began crossing the Naktong River under cover of darkness at certain points. On the southernmost flank of the US 9th Infantry Regiment river line, just above the junction of the Nam River with the Naktong, A Company of the 1st Battalion was dug in on a long finger ridge paralleling the Naktong that terminates in Hill 94 at the Kihang ferry site. The river road from Namji-ri running west along the Naktong passes the southern tip of this ridge and crosses to the west side of the river at the ferry. A small village called Agok lay at the base of Hill 94 and 300 yards (270 m) from the river. A patrol of tanks and armored vehicles, together with two infantry squads of A Company, 9th Infantry, held a roadblock near the ferry and close to Agok. On the evening of August 31, A Company moved from its ridge positions overlooking Agok and the river to new positions along the river below the ridge line.

=== Medal of Honor action ===
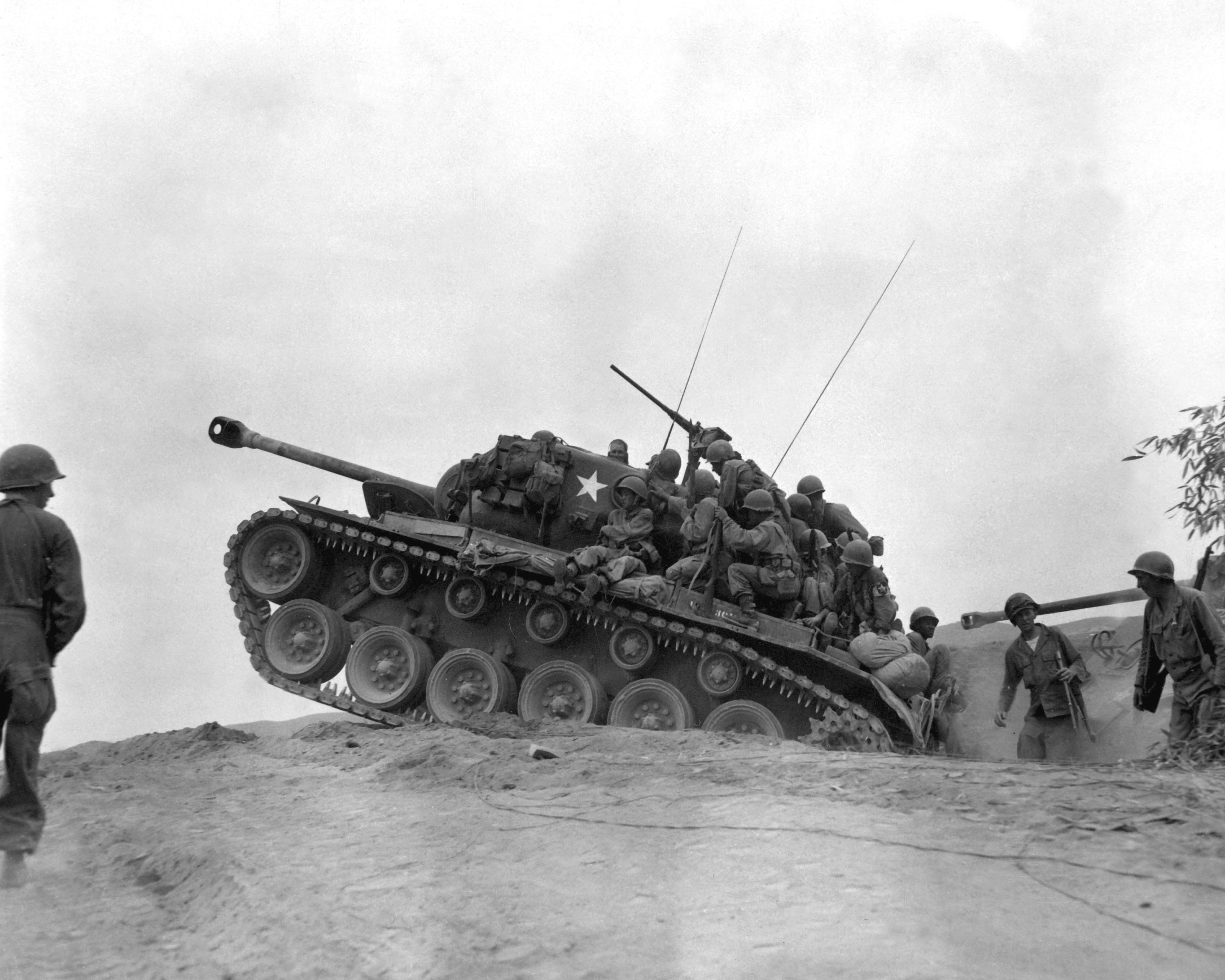
An M26 Pershing tank supporting troops of the 9th Infantry along the banks of the Naktong River during the Second Battle of Naktong Bulge in September 1950.

That evening, Kouma led the patrol of two M26 Pershing tanks and two M19 Gun Motor Carriages in Agok, along the Naktong River. Kouma placed his patrol on the west side of Agok near the Kihang ferry. At 20:00, a heavy fog covered the river, and at 22:00 mortar shells began falling on the American-held side of the river. By 22:15, this strike intensified and North Korean mortar preparation struck A Company's positions. American mortars and artillery began responding with counter-battery fire. Some of A Company's men reported hearing noises on the opposite side of the river and splashes in the water.

At 22:30, the fog lifted and Kouma saw that a North Korean pontoon bridge was being laid across the river directly in front of his position. Kouma's four vehicles attacked this structure, with Kouma manning the M2 Browning .50-caliber machine gun atop the tank. As the gunner fired the tank's main cannon, Kouma sank many of the boats attempting to cross the river with his machine gun. At 23:00, a small arms fight flared around the left side of A Company north of the tanks. This gunfire had lasted only two or three minutes when the A Company roadblock squads near the tanks heard over the field telephone that the company was withdrawing and that they should do likewise. Kouma instead opted to act as a rearguard to cover the infantry. He was wounded shortly thereafter in the foot reloading the tank's ammunition. He quickly fought off another North Korean attack across the river with his machine gun.

Kouma's force was then ambushed by a group of North Koreans dressed in US military uniforms. Kouma was wounded a second time, in the shoulder, as he beat back repeated North Korean crossings with his machine gun. Several strong attacks came within meters of the tank, but Kouma was able to drive them back despite his wounds. Eventually, the other three vehicles withdrew or were neutralized, and Kouma held the Agok crossing site until 07:30 the next morning with just his tank. At one point, the tank was surrounded and Kouma had to engage the North Koreans from outside the tank with machine gun fire at point blank range. After the tank gun's ammunition was expended, Kouma used his pistol and grenades to hold off the North Koreans. The tank then withdrew 8 miles (13 km) to the newly established American lines, destroying three North Korean machine gun positions along the way. During his action, Kouma had killed an estimated 250 North Korean troops. His actions in this fight alone surpassed the highly decorated US Army soldier Audie Murphy, who was credited with 240 kills during World War II, and who had been the second most decorated US soldier in the war. His single-handed heroic battle may have served as a seed for the fictional WWII movie, Fury (2014 film).

Once he returned to his unit, Kouma attempted to resupply his tank and return to the front lines. Instead, the wounded Kouma was ordered to evacuate for medical treatment. As he was being evacuated, Kouma again requested to return to the front lines.

== Subsequent career and retirement ==
Kouma was returned to duty three days later. Shortly thereafter, he was promoted to master sergeant, and evacuated to the United States to be presented with the Medal of Honor. Originally, Kouma had been awarded the Distinguished Service Cross, but that award was upgraded to the Medal of Honor.

On May 19, 1951, Kouma was presented the Medal of Honor by US President Harry S. Truman in a ceremony at the White House. He got his medal alongside Carl Dodd and John Pittman, two other 2nd Infantry Division soldiers who were awarded the medal. Afterward, Kouma served as a recruiter in Omaha, Nebraska. Kouma then spent the remainder of the Korean War as a tank gunnery instructor for the US Army Armor School at Fort Knox, Kentucky.

Following the end of the war, Kouma remained in the Army. He served a second tour of duty as a recruiter, and then two tours as a tank commander, first at a unit in Fort Carson, Colorado, and then with a second unit in Germany. Though he remained in the Army for 31 years, Kouma did not see combat after his time in Korea.

Kouma retired in 1971 at the age of 52, and lived a quiet life in McDaniels, Kentucky, after retirement.

Kouma died on December 19, 1993, and was buried in the Fort Knox post cemetery. The Tank Platoon Gunnery Excellence competition at Fort Knox was subsequently named in Kouma's honor. There is also a dining facility named in his honor at Fort Knox on Eisenhower Road and a dining facility at Fort Benning.

== Medal of Honor citation ==
Kouma, along with Dodd and Pittman, were the first soldiers to be awarded the Medal of Honor in the Korean War who were present for the presentation of their medals. It was reported the other nine soldiers who were awarded the medal, were done so posthumously. Unbeknownst to the public, Major General William F. Dean, who had been awarded the medal for actions in the Battle of Taejon, was actually a prisoner of war in North Korea.

Rank and organization: Master Sergeant (then Sergeant First Class) U.S. Army, Company A, 72nd Tank Battalion

Place and date: Vicinity of Agok, Korea, August 31, and September 1, 1950
Entered service at: Dwight, Nebr. Born: November 23, 1919, Dwight, Nebraska
G.O. No.: 38, June 4, 1951
Citation:
M/Sgt. Kouma, a tank commander in Company A, distinguished himself by conspicuous gallantry and intrepidity at the risk of his life above and beyond the call of duty in action against the enemy. His unit was engaged in supporting infantry elements on the Naktong River front. Near midnight on August 31, a hostile force estimated at 500 crossed the river and launched a fierce attack against the infantry positions, inflicting heavy casualties. A withdrawal was ordered and his armored unit was given the mission of covering the movement until a secondary position could be established. The enemy assault overran 2 tanks, destroyed 1 and forced another to withdraw. Suddenly M/Sgt. Kouma discovered that his tank was the only obstacle in the path of the hostile onslaught. Holding his ground, he gave fire orders to his crew and remained in position throughout the night, fighting off repeated enemy attacks. During 1 fierce assault, the enemy surrounded his tank and he leaped from the armored turret, exposing himself to a hail of hostile fire, manned the .50 caliber machine gun mounted on the rear deck, and delivered pointblank fire into the fanatical foe. His machine gun emptied, he fired his pistol and threw grenades to keep the enemy from his tank. After more than 9 hours of constant combat and close-in fighting, he withdrew his vehicle to friendly lines. During the withdrawal through 8 miles of hostile territory, M/Sgt. Kouma continued to inflict casualties upon the enemy and exhausted his ammunition in destroying 3 hostile machine gun positions. During this action, M/Sgt. Kouma killed an estimated 250 enemy soldiers. His magnificent stand allowed the infantry sufficient time to reestablish defensive positions. Rejoining his company, although suffering intensely from his wounds, he attempted to resupply his tank and return to the battle area. While being evacuated for medical treatment, his courage was again displayed when he requested to return to the front. M/Sgt. Kouma's superb leadership, heroism, and intense devotion to duty reflect the highest credit on himself and uphold the esteemed traditions of the U.S. Army.

== Awards and Decorations ==
Kouma's decorations included the following medals:

| 1st row | Medal of Honor | | |
| 2nd row | Purple Heart with 1 Oak leaf cluster | Army Good Conduct Medal | American Defense Service Medal |
| 3rd row | American Campaign Medal | Asiatic-Pacific Campaign Medal | European-African-Middle Eastern Campaign Medal with 3 Campaign stars |
| | World War II Victory Medal | Army of Occupation Medal | National Defense Service Medal with 1 Oak leaf cluster |
| 3rd row | Korean Service Medal with 3 Campaign stars | United Nations Service Medal Korea | Korean War Service Medal Retroactively Awarded, 2003 |
| Unit awards | Presidential Unit Citation with 1 Oak leaf cluster | | Korean Presidential Unit Citation |

| 9th Armored Division Insignia | 2nd Infantry Division Insignia |

== See also ==
- List of Korean War Medal of Honor recipients

== Citations ==
=== Sources ===
- Alexander, Bevin (2003), Korea: The First War We Lost, New York, New York: Hippocrene Books, ISBN 978-0-7818-1019-7
- Appleman, Roy E. (1998), South to the Naktong, North to the Yalu: United States Army in the Korean War, Washington, D.C.: Department of the Army, ISBN 978-0-16-001918-0, archived from the original on 2013-11-02
- Ecker, Richard E. (2004), Battles of the Korean War: A Chronology, with Unit-by-Unit United States Casualty Figures & Medal of Honor Citations, Jefferson, North Carolina: McFarland & Company, ISBN 978-0-7864-1980-7
- Fehrenbach, T.R. (2001) [1994], This Kind of War: The Classic Korean War History – Fiftieth Anniversary Edition, Washington, D.C.: Potomac Books Inc., ISBN 978-1-57488-334-3
- Owens, Ron (2004), Medal of Honor: Historical Facts and Figures, Lexington, Kentucky: Turner Publishing Company, ISBN 978-1-56311-995-8
- Willbanks, James H. (2011), America's Heroes: Medal of Honor Recipients from the Civil War to Afghanistan, Santa Barbara, California: ABC-CLIO, ISBN 978-1-59884-393-4
- Young, Gordon Russell (1959), Army Almanac: A Book of Facts Concerning the Army of the United States, Mechanicsburg, Pennsylvania: Stackpole Books, ASIN B0006D8NKK
