= Lischka =

Lischka is a surname that is a Germanized spelling variant of the Czech surname Liška, meaning 'fox'. Notable people include:

- Burkhard Lischka (born 1965), German lawyer and politician
- David Lischka (born 1997), Czech footballer
- Hans Lischka (born 1943), Austrian computational theoretical chemist
- Kurt Lischka (1909–1989), German SS official, Gestapo chief and commandant of the Security
- Lutz Lischka (1944–2024), Austrian judoka
- Vera Lischka (born 1977), Austrian swimmer
