= Ad Liska =

American baseball player (1906–1998)

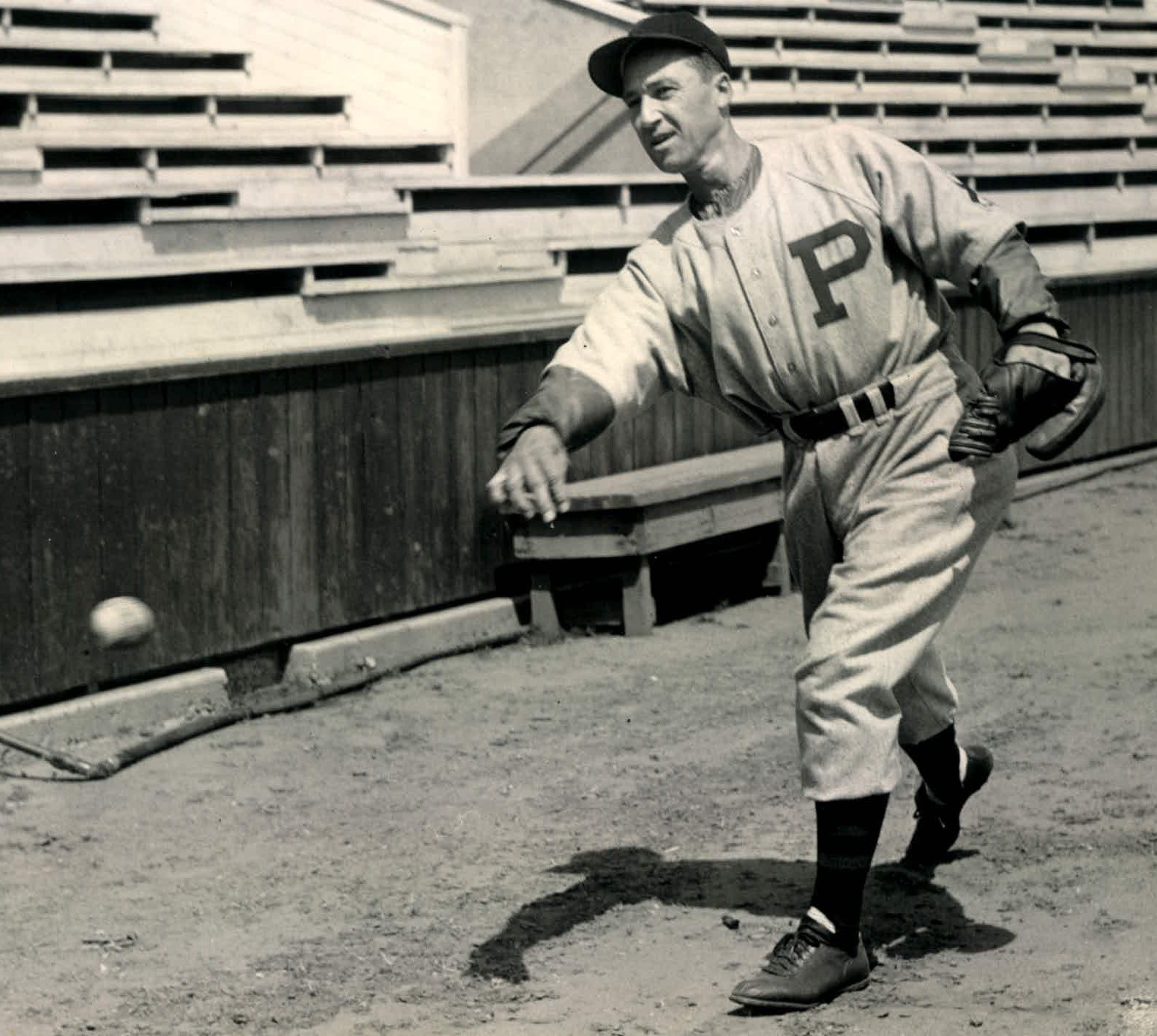
- Pitcher
- Born: July 10, 1906; Dwight, Nebraska, U.S.
- Died: November 30, 1998 (aged 92); Portland, Oregon, U.S.
- Batted: Right Threw: Right

MLB debut
- April 17, 1929, for the Washington Senators

Last MLB appearance
- September 24, 1933, for the Philadelphia Phillies

MLB statistics
- Win–loss record: 17–18
- Earned run average: 3.87
- Strikeouts: 104
- Stats at Baseball Reference

Teams
- Washington Senators (1929–1931); Philadelphia Phillies (1932–1933)

Adolph James Liska (July 10, 1906 – November 30, 1998) was an American baseball pitcher who played five years in Major League Baseball and 14 for the Portland Beavers of the Pacific Coast League.

== Early life and career ==
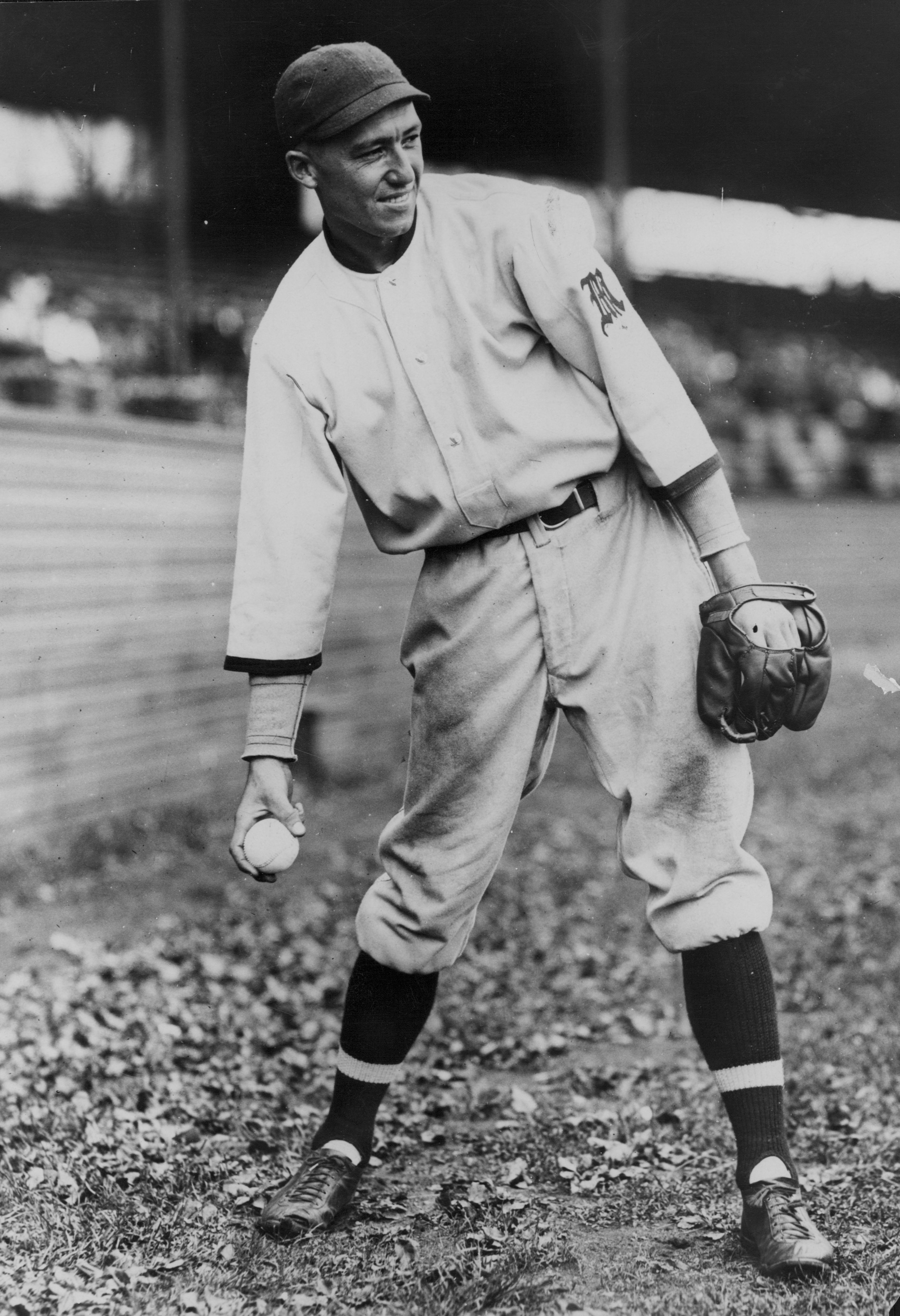
Liska with the Minneapolis Millers, ca. 1927

Born in Nebraska, Liska taught elementary school and pitched briefly for the University of Nebraska before joining the minor league Lincoln Links of the Western League in 1926. A submarine pitcher, he earned a 20–4 record with the Minneapolis Millers of the American Association, which earned him a shot at the majors in 1929.

== Major League career ==
Liska played two full seasons with the Washington Senators and part of a third. He joined the Philadelphia Phillies in 1932 where he played two seasons, compiling a 17–18 overall record with an ERA of 3.87.

== Portland Beavers ==
Liska returned to the minor leagues for two more seasons and then found a home with the Portland Beavers of the Pacific Coast League in 1936. He went on to play 14 years for the Beavers, winning 15 or more games nine times. In 1936, his 15 wins helped the Beavers win the PCL championship. In 1945, at the age of 39, he won 20 games, leading the Beavers to the best record in the league. Liska finally retired following the 1949 season at the age of 42. He managed the minor league Salem Senators for the 1950 season and then retired from baseball and worked in the United States Postal Service.

== Legacy ==
He was inducted into the Oregon Sports Hall of Fame in 1982 and the Pacific Coast League Hall of Fame in 2003. He died in Portland in 1998 at the age of 92.
