= Allen Liska =

American sociologist and criminologist

- Born: May 15, 1940
- Died: December 17, 1998 (aged 58); Albany, New York
- Education: University of Wisconsin–Madison
- Known for: Social psychology, sociology of crime and deviance
- Spouse: Jeanette Liska (until his death)
- Children: 2
- Awards: Named a Fellow of the American Society of Criminology in November 1998
- Scientific career
- Fields: Sociology, criminology
- Workplaces: University at Albany, SUNY
- Thesis: Deviant and Non-deviant Examination Practices: A Study of the Impact of Attitude on Behavior (1975)
- Doctoral students: Paul Bellair

Allen Erwin Liska (May 15, 1940 – December 17, 1998 in Albany, New York) was an American sociologist and criminologist. He was a full professor at the University at Albany, SUNY from 1982 until his death in 1998, having originally joined the faculty there in 1979. From 1985 to 1988, he was the chair of the Department of Sociology there. He supervised more Ph.D. students than any other faculty member in the University at Albany, SUNY's sociology department. During his career, he also served as chair of the American Sociological Association's Section on Crime, Law, and Deviance. He was named a fellow of the American Society of Criminology in November 1998. In 1999, he was one of four University at Albany, SUNY faculty members to receive the university's Excellence in Research Award.

== Fishbein/Ajzen model evaluation ==
In 1984 Liska stated that the 1975 Fishbein/Azjen model had brought significant order to earlier "other variables" research on inconsistencies between people's attitude and behavior, but argued that the Fishbein/Ajzen model was not "complex enough to organize and coordinate much contemporary research." Liska reviewed research showing deviations from the two defining features of the Fishbein/Ajzen model: the assumptions that the effect of an individual's social environment on his or her behavior is expressed through behavioral intentions, and that the effect of the individual's social environment on these behavioral intentions can be assumed to be solely a function of two intermediaries, individual attitudes and social norms. Liska described and illustrated a set of specific expansions to the Fishbein/Ajzen model, and proposed a much more intricate model which incorporated most of these more specific expansions.

Richard A. Davis evaluated Liska's revisions of the Fishbein/Ajzen model using a study where the 1970 educational attainments of a set of high school students were modeled, based on information collected in 1955 when the students were high school sophomores. Davis found partial support for the Fishbein/Ajzen model, since in predicting a sophomore's ultimate educational attainment "behavioral intentions maintain their centrality." At the same time, Davis found that the social environment of the high school sophomores "maintains a direct unmediated effect on both intentions" (bypassing direct influence of the sophomores' individual attitudes and social norms) "and behavior" (bypassing direct influence of the sophomores' behavioral intentions). Davis concluded that, despite the valuable parsimony of the Fishbein/Ajzen model, "Liska's revisions have been supported in large measure."
