= Richardson Township, Butler County, Nebraska =

Richardson Township
- Township
- Location in Butler County
- Coordinates: 41°05′27″N 096°57′44″W
- Country: United States
- State: Nebraska
- County: Butler

Area
  - Total: 36.03 sq mi (93.32 km^{2})
  - Land: 35.90 sq mi (92.99 km^{2})
  - Water: 0.13 sq mi (0.33 km^{2}) 0.35%
- Elevation: 1,467 ft (447 m)

Population (2020)
  - Total: 433
  - Density: 12.1/sq mi (4.66/km^{2})
- GNIS feature ID: 0838210

Richardson Township is one of seventeen townships in Butler County, Nebraska, United States. The population was 433 at the 2020 census. A 2021 estimate placed the township's population at 437.

The Village of Dwight lies within the Township.

== See also ==
- County government in Nebraska
