= Vivian Liska =

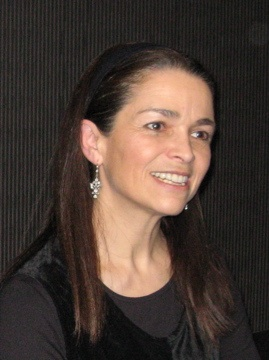
- Born: New York City, United States
- Scientific career
- Fields: German Literature, Literary theory
- Workplaces: University of Antwerp

Vivian Liska, born in New York City, United States is a professor of German literature and director of the Institute of Jewish Studies at the University of Antwerp, Belgium. Since 2013 she is also distinguished visiting professor at Hebrew University, Jerusalem.

== Biography ==
Liska received her BA from the University of Maryland (European Division) in 1984, her Licentiate from the University of Antwerp in 1987 and her PhD from the University of Antwerp in 1996.

In 1991 she started her academic career as assistant professor at the University of Antwerp. Since 1996 she is professor of German literature and since 2001 director of the Institute of Jewish Studies at the University of Antwerp, Belgium. Since 2013 she is distinguished visiting professor at the Hebrew University of Jerusalem.

Her main academic work focuses on modern German literature, literary theory, German-Jewish thought, feminist theory, and modernism. Liska's critical work has dealt with, among others, Walter Benjamin, Franz Kafka, Hannah Arendt, Giorgio Agamben, Maurice Blanchot and Theodor Adorno.

== Publications ==
- 1993. "Die Nacht der Hymnen: Paul Celans Gedichte 1938-1944". Bern: Peter Lang.
- 1998 (with Geert Lernout, eds.). "Zwischen allen Stühlen: Festschrift Jean-Paul Bier". Leuven: Acco.
- 1998. "Die Dichterin und das schelmische Erhabene. Else Lasker-Schülers 'Die Nächte Tino von Bagdads'". Tübingen: Francke.
- 2000. "Die Moderne - ein Weib. Am Beispiel von Romanen Ricarda Huchs und Annette Kolbs". Tübingen: Francke.
- 2005. "Irgendwo/Ergens". Wetteren: Cultura.
- 2006. Det utidssvarende i den tyske ekspressionisme. Aalborg: Aalborg Universitet.
- 2007 (with Ortrud Gutjahr and Béatrice Dumiche, eds.). Geschlechterdifferenzen als Kulturkonflikte. Bern: Peter Lang.
- 2007 (with Thomas Nolden, eds.). Contemporary Jewish Writing in Europe: A Guide. Bloomington: Indiana University Press.
- 2007 (with Astradur Eysteinsson, eds.). Modernism. 2 volumes. Amsterdam/Philadelphia: John Benjamins.
- 2007 (with Mark Gelber, eds.). Theodor Herzl between Europe and Zion. Tübingen: Niemeyer.
- 2007 (with Arthur Cools, Sabine Hillen, and Erik Oger, eds.). De macht van de sirene: kennis en verleiding in de moderniteit. Ghent: Academia Press.
- 2008. Giorgio Agambens leerer Messianismus. Wien: Schlebrügge.
- 2009 (with Sascha Kirchner, Karl Solibakke, and Bernd Witte, eds.). Walter Benjamin und das Wiener Judentum zwischen 1900 und 1938. Würzburg: Königshausen und Neumann.
- 2009. When Kafka Says We. Uncommon Communities in German-Jewish Literature. Bloomington: Indiana University Press.
- 2009 (with Eva Meyer, eds.). What Does the Veil Know?. Wien/New York: Springer.
- 2010. Hameshichut ha'rikah shel Giorgio Agamben. Tel Aviv: Resling.
- 2011. Fremde Gemeinschaft. Deutsch-jüdische Literatur der Moderne. Göttingen: Wallstein.
- 2011. (with Sonja Klein, Karl Solibakke, Bernd Witte) Gedächtnisstrategien und Medien im interkulturellen Dialog. Würzburg: Königshausen & Neumann.
- 2012. Jumping out of History. Hannah Arendt and Franz Kafka (in Hebrew). Ramat Gan: Bar Ilan University Press.
- 2013. (with Sylvia Jaworski, eds.) Am Rand: Grenzen und Peripherien in der europäisch-jüdischen Literatur. Text + Kritik, München.
- 2014. Gershom Scholem, Lament and Lamentation. Special issue of Jewish Studies Quarterly 21:1, Tübingen: Mohr Siebeck.
- 2014. "Before the Law stands a doorkeeper. To this doorkeeper comes a man...": Kafka, Narrative, and the Law. Rutgers German Studies Occasional Papers No. 16, New Jersey: Rutgers University.
- 2014-. Editor of Book Series Perspectives on Jewish Texts and Contexts. Berlin: De Gruyter.
- 2015. (with Steven Aschheim, eds.) The German-Jewish Experience Revisited. Berlin: De Gruyter.
- 2016. (with Arthur Cools, eds.) Kafka and the Universal. Berlin: De Gruyter.
- 2017. German-Jewish Thought and its Afterlife: A Tenuous Legacy. Bloomington: Indiana University Press.
- 2017. (with Michael Baris, eds.) Judaism, Law and Literature. London: Jewish Law Association.
